= Battle of Jajce (1878) =

- Part of the Austro-Hungarian campaign in Bosnia and Herzegovina
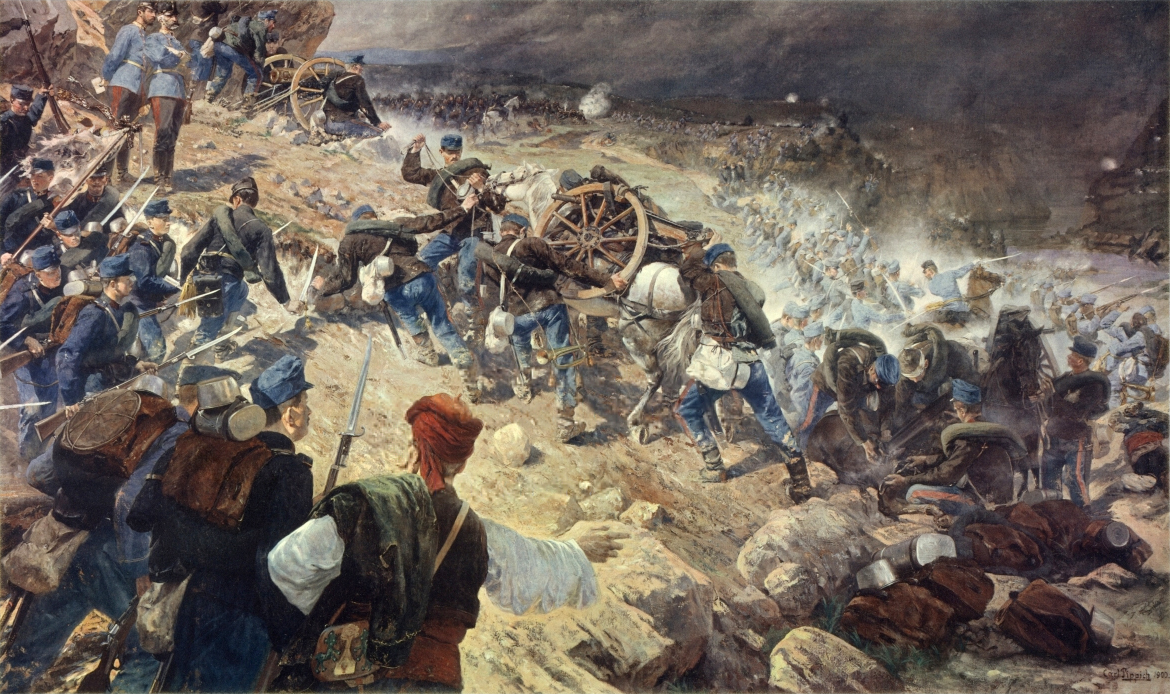
- Battle of Jajce (Karl Pippich, 1890)
Date	7 August 1878
Location	Jajce, Bosnia and Herzegovina
Result	Austro-Hungarian victory

Belligerents
Austria-Hungary	Bosnia Vilayet

Commanders and leaders
(Austria-Hungary) Duke William of Württemberg	?

Units involved
Carniolan XVII. Infantry Division	Bosnian rebels

Strength
? some artillery batteries	c. 6,000 rebels

Casualties and losses
c. 600 killed hundreds of wounded	Unknown

The Battle of Jajce was a military engagement between Austria-Hungary and Bosnian rebels supported by the Ottoman Empire that took place on August 7, 1878, as part of the Austro-Hungarian military campaign in Bosnia (Bosnia vilayet) in the for control of the strategic town of Jajce. This was one of the most extensive engagements of the entire campaign, in which the Austro-Hungarian Expeditionary Forces suffered more than six hundred casualties, the heaviest losses during one day of the entire campaign.

== Background ==
At the end of the Russo-Turkish War during the Congress of Berlin, the Treaty of Berlin was established which in article 25 gave Austria-Hungary the responsibility to occupy and administer the Ottoman provinces of Bosnia and Herzegovina indefinitely while it still stayed under the sovereignty of the Ottoman Empire. A campaign was organized to establish Austro-Hungarian rule in Bosnia and Herzegovina on 29 July 1878 which saw mostly combat against local resistance fighters supported by the Ottoman Empire. The Austro-Hungarian army advanced into the country from the northern border towards the south, meeting little military resistance. The Austro-Hungarian command did not even count on significant resistance and could easily underestimate the combat situation, as happened during one of the first clashes like the Battle of Maglaj, where part of the Austrian cavalry troops fell into a trap.

== Battle ==
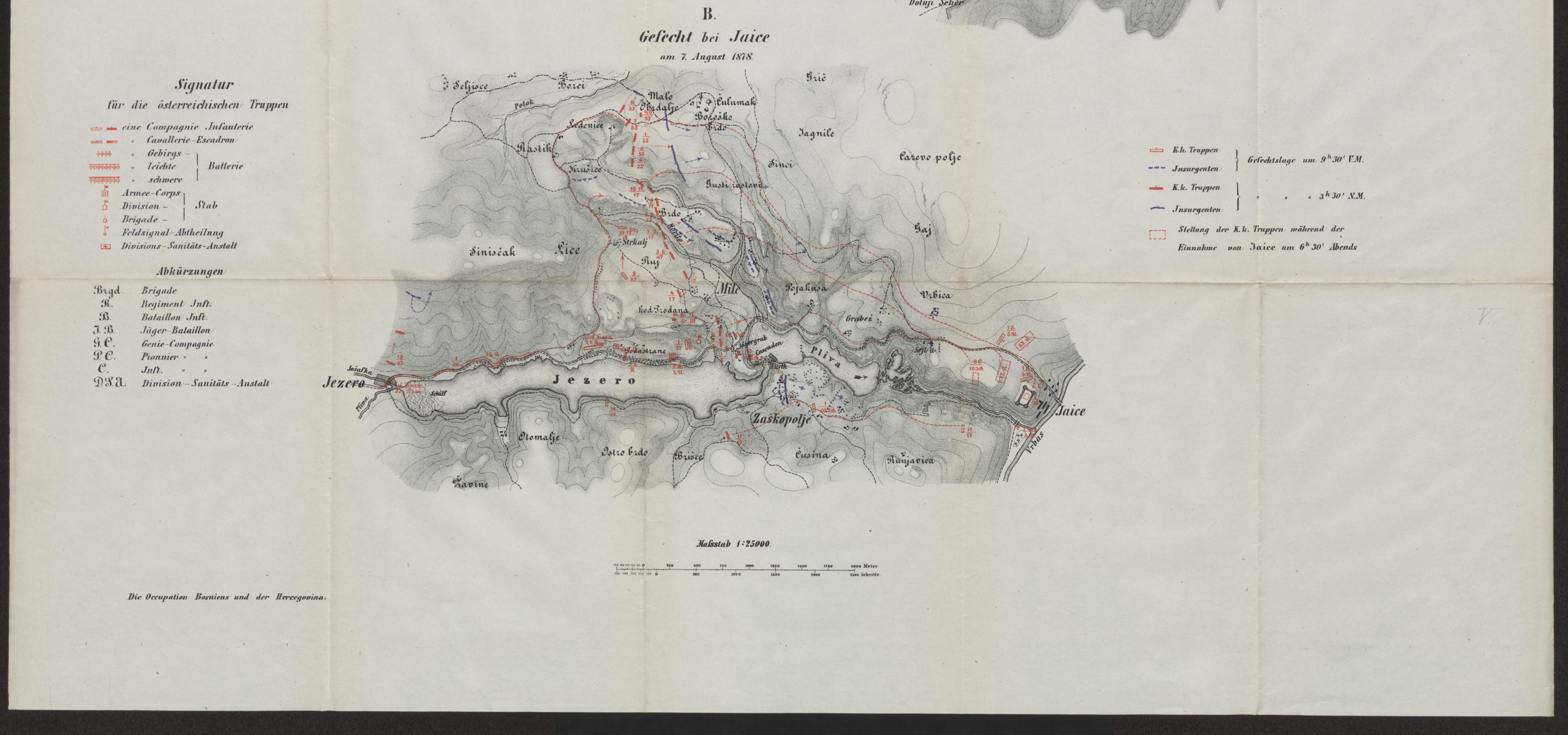
Austrian map of the battle from 1879

On August 7, the Austro-Hungarian army, consisting mainly of infantry units of the Carniolan XVII. Infantry Division under the command of Duke William of Württemberg, advanced towards the fortress town of Jajce on the Vrbas River, controlled by Ottoman-supported Bosnian rebels. Not far from the city, the cordon was ambushed by a force of about six thousand Bosnian insurgents, mostly former soldiers of the Ottoman army of the Bosnian origin. Due to surprise and probably the complicated mountainous terrain, the Austro-Hungarian army achieved victory at the cost of heavy losses, reported to be approximately six hundred dead.

== Aftermath ==
After the battle town of Jajce was captured by the winners. The action was one of the most significant clashes of the entire Austro-Hungarian military campaign, along with the Battle of Doboj on September 4 and 5 or the capture of Sarajevo in September 19. The whole campaign ended on October 20, 1878, when the last Bosnian partisan units operating in the mountains surrendered and the original Bosnian vilayet vanished. The subsequent presence of Austro-Hungarian power in Bosnia and Herzegovina persisted through the so-called Bosnian Crisis until the end of World War I, including the crucial assassination of Archduke Franz Ferdinand of Austria in Sarajevo on June 28, 1914.

== Works cited ==
- BENCZE, László. SCHUBERT, Frank N. (ed.). The Occupation of Bosnia and Herzegovina in 1878. East European Monographs. Vol. 126. New York: Columbia University Press. 2005.
- MAYERHOFFER VON VEDROPOLJE, Eberhard. Das Gefecht bei Jajce am 7. August 1878. L. W. Seidel & Sohn, Vienna. 1904. (German)
