= Maximilian Njegovan =

Austro-Hungarian admiral

Maksimilijan Njegovan
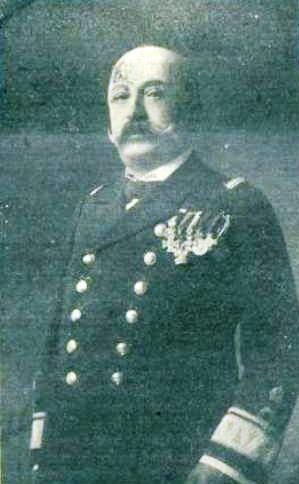
- Born: 30 October 1858; Zagreb, Kingdom of Croatia, Austrian Empire (now Croatia)
- Died: 1 July 1930 (aged 71); Zagreb, Croatia Kingdom of Yugoslavia
- Military career
- Allegiance: Austria-Hungary
- Branch: Austro-Hungarian Navy
- Service years: 1877–1918
- Rank: Grand Admiral (on the retired list)
- Commands: Chef der Marinesektion (Commander of Navy) (April 1917); Flottenkommandant (Fleet Commander) (1917); Commander of the 1stDiv of the 1st Battle Sqdr and battleship Tegetthoff (1914); Chief of staff of Navy Commander (1907-1909); Commander of the battleship Budapest (1905-1907)
- Conflicts: First World War
- Awards: Order of the Iron Crown (1917); Order of Leopold (Austria) (1914)

Maksimilijan Njegovan (31 October 1858 – 1 July 1930) was an Austro-Hungarian admiral of Croatian descent. He was the Navy's senior administrator as well as its fleet commander in World War I, from 1917 to 1918. He "inherited a competent but exhausted service."

== Background ==
Njegovan was born in 1858 in Agram (now Zagreb). Upon graduation from the Imperial and Royal Naval Academy in Fiume (now Rijeka), he joined the fleet in Pola (Pula) in 1877 as a Seekadett. In 1893, after receiving a short instructional course as torpedo officer of Alpha, he received his first command, the torpedo boat Condor.

At the naval academy, he was an instructor in seamanship from 1898 to 1905. Njegovan then held command of the battleship Budapest until 1907. He served from 1907 to 1909 as chief of staff to the Marinekommandant (navy commander), Rudolf Montecuccoli, and as adjutant and chief of operations of the Marinesektion (Naval Section of the War Ministry), of which Montecuccoli was Chef (chief).

He was promoted to Konteradmiral in 1911 and Vizeadmiral in 1913. In the spring of the same year he commanded naval units at the international Blockade of Montenegro. At the outbreak of the First World War in 1914 he was named commander of the 1st Division of the 1st Battle Squadron, hoisting his flag in the dreadnought battleship Tegetthoff. Njegovan was decorated with the Order of Leopold for his bombardment of Ancona the night Italy declared war on the empire, 23/24 May 1915.

== Fleet commander ==
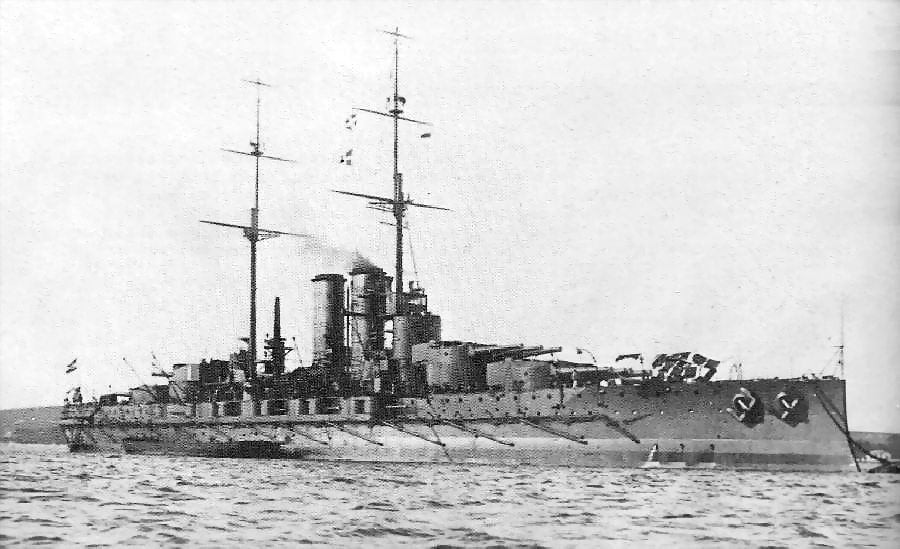
SMS Tegetthoff

In February 1917 he succeeded the late Grossadmiral Anton Haus as Marinekommandant and as Flottenkommandant (fleet commander). Promoted to full admiral, he was appointed to the additional post of Chef der Marinesektion in April 1917, succeeding the late Karl Kailer von Kaltenfels. Njegovan was the last man to hold all three posts. He received the Grand Cross of the Order of the Iron Crown for the battle of the Otranto Straits, 14/15 May 1917.

Njegovan continued Haus' strategy of preserving his major forces as a 'fleet in being'. However, he was unable to ease ethnic tensions on individual warships, where sailors were also influenced by radical agitators. Another pressing problem for which Njegovan could find no solution involved shortages of food, fuel, and other vital supplies. In the face of such difficulties, in 1917, Kaiser Wilhelm II of Germany and Kaiser Karl I of Austria proposed an unrealistic plan for an invasion of Venice using the whole fleet. Njegovan steadfastly opposed the proposal, which eventually was dropped.

The abortive nationalist-inspired mutiny at Cattaro (Kotor) in February 1918 underscored the need for a more energetic fleet commander. Relieved of command, Njegovan was succeeded as Flottenkommandant by Miklós Horthy and as Chef der Marinesektion by Franz von Holub. The office of Marinekommandant was left vacant.

Retired on 1 March 1918, Njegovan spent the rest of the war in Pola. Pensioned and promoted to Grossadmiral on the retired list, he was decorated with the Grand Cross of the Order of Leopold for his services to the Empire.

== Postwar ==
After the war, Njegovan lived for a time in Venice. His homeland of Croatia had become part of the new country of the Kingdom of Serbs, Croats, and Slovenes, and in 1930 he died in his hometown of Zagreb at the age of 71. He is buried in Mirogoj cemetery.

== See also ==
- Austro-Hungarian Navy
- Gavrilo Rodić
- Petar Preradović
- Svetozar Borojević
- Paul Davidovich
- Arsenije Sečujac
- Paul von Radivojevich
- Peter Vitus von Quosdanovich
- Mathias Rukavina von Boynograd
- Leonidas von Popp

Military offices
Preceded by Anton Haus	Commander-in-Chief of the Austro-Hungarian Naval Fleet; 1917 - 1918	Succeeded by Miklós Horthy
