= SMS Donau =

Three ships of the Austro-Hungarian Navy have been named SMS Donau:

- SMS Donau (1856), a screw frigate launched in 1856, member of the Radetzky class
- SMS Donau (1874), a screw corvette launched in 1874
- SMS Donau (1893), a screw corvette launched in 1893
