= Battle of Doboj (1878) =

- Part of Austro-Hungarian campaign in Bosnia and Herzegovina in 1878
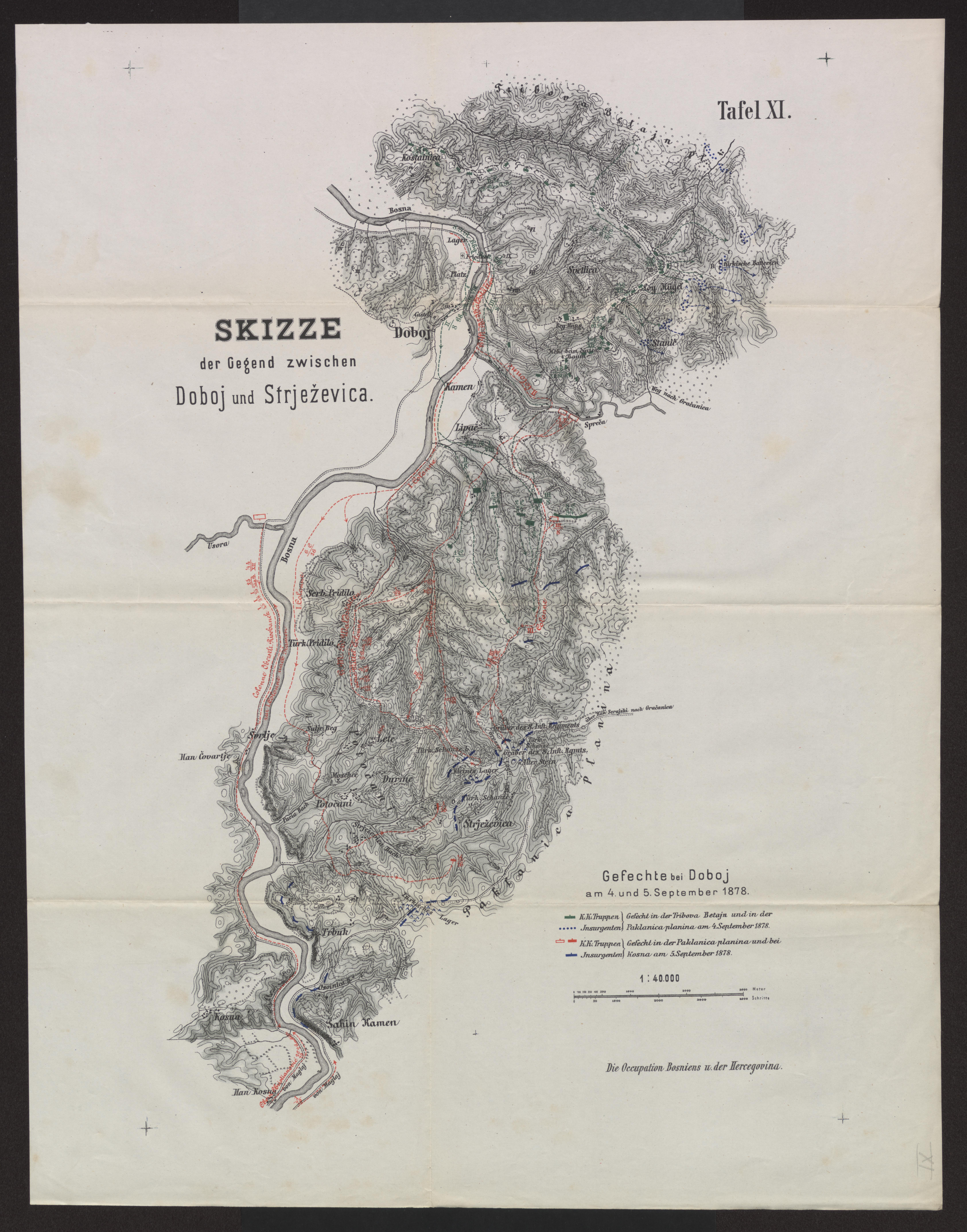
- Map of the clash near Doboj and Strježevice from the year 1879
| Date | 4 – 6 September 1878 |
| Location | Doboj, Bosnia vilayet |
| Result | Austro-Hungarian victory |

Belligerents
| Austria-Hungary | Ottoman Empire: Bosnia vilayet |

Commanders and leaders
| Unknown | Unknown |

Units involved
| 8th Infantry Regiment Brno; 54th Infantry Regiment Olomouc | Unknown |

Strength
| Unknown | Several hundred |

Casualties and losses
| More than 30 dead dozens wounded | Dozens killed and wounded |

Battle of Doboj was a military engagement between Austria-Hungary and the Ottoman Empire that took place from 4 to 6 September 1878 as part of the Austro-Hungarian military campaign in the Bosnian Vilayet for control of the town of Doboj on the Bosna River. Units of the Austro-Hungarian Expeditionary Force, consisting mainly of the Moravian Infantry Regiments No. 8 from Brno and No. 54 from Olomouc, defeated the Bosnian troops.

== Prelude ==
From 13 June to 13 July 1878, at the Congress of Berlin, attended by representatives of Austria-Hungary, the German Empire, the United Kingdom, Russia, the Ottoman Empire and Italy, which resolved the so-called Great Eastern Crisis in the Balkans, it was agreed, among other things, that Bosnia and Herzegovina would be temporarily occupied and administered by Austria-Hungary at the expense of the Ottoman Empire in order to maintain political and ethnic stability in the region. On 29 July 1878, the XIII Army Corps of the Austro-Hungarian Expeditionary Force, under the command of General Josip Filipović, who had the overall command of the entire military operation, crossed the Sava River at several points and began occupying the territory of the Bosnian Vilayet.

The main body of the imperial army advanced into the area from the northern border towards the south, where it met with little military resistance. The Austro-Hungarian command did not even count on significant resistance and could easily have underestimated the combat situation.

== Timeline of engagement ==
Doboj is a town in Bosnia and Herzegovina, near Banja Luka. During the occupation of Bosnia and Herzegovina by the Austro-Hungarian army in 1878, its surroundings became the scene of bloody battles with Muslim rebels in late August and September.

On September 4, 1878, rebel fighters attacked units of the 54th Infantry Regiment. Fierce fighting continued throughout the day, at the end of which the regiment had 70 dead and wounded. On September 5, fierce fighting continued, and the Brno 8th Regiment attacked the rebel positions, but its attack was repelled. On September 6, the 49th and 54th Regiments joined the fighting, with soldiers from Haná taking over the position of the Brno regiment. The units gradually advanced, and eventually it was discovered that the enemy had evacuated the positions. Only mutilated and mutilated soldiers were found, who had been captured by Muslims the previous night. The men of the 4th Battalion buried 32 mutilated corpses.

== Aftermath ==
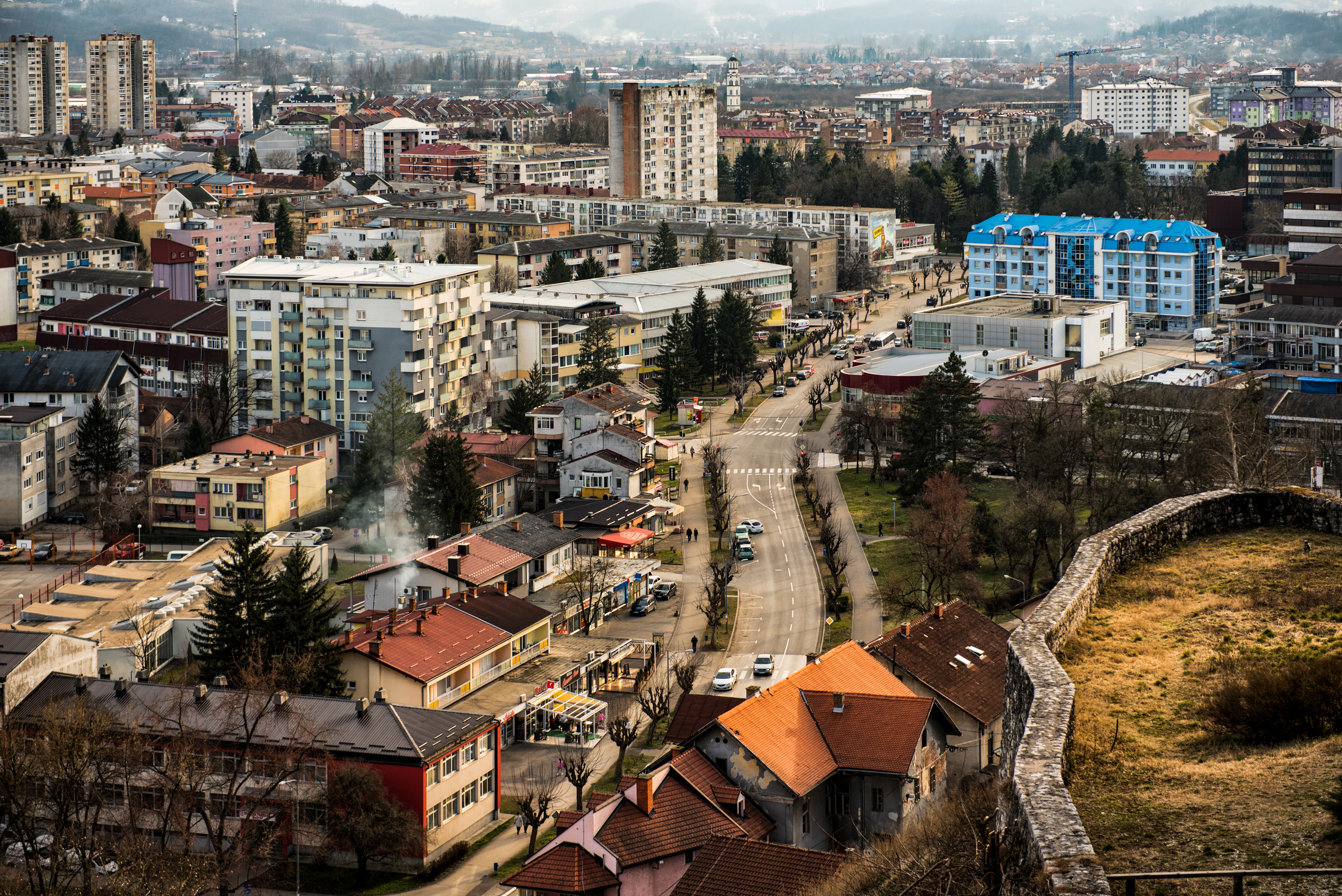
View of the city of Doboj in 2020

The battle was one of the most significant clashes of the entire Austro-Hungarian military campaign, alongside the previous battles of Maglaj and Sarajevo. The fighting ended on 20 October 1878, when the campaign was officially ended, the Bosnian partisan units operating in the mountains surrendered, and the original Bosnian Vilayet ceased to exist. The subsequent dominance of Austro-Hungarian power in Bosnia and Herzegovina persisted through the so-called Bosnian Crisis until the end of World War I, including the crucial assassination of Archduke Franz Ferdinand in Sarajevo on 28 June 1914.

== Memory ==
The events of the war are also reflected in the popular military song Za císarě pána, which mentions the fight against Bosnian rebels in Bosnia and Herzegovina. The central text is the verse "For the emperor and his family we had to fight for Herzegovina..."

== Links ==
=== Literature ===
- BENCZE, László. SCHUBERT, Frank N. (ed.). The Occupation of Bosnia and Herzegovina in 1878. East European Monographs. Vol. 126. New York: Columbia University Press. 2005.
- FUČÍK, Josef. Operace rakousko-uherské armády v Bosně a Hercegovině 1878 a 1881-1882 na základě mandátu Berlínského kongresu. Historie a vojenství: Časopis Historického ústavu Armády ČR. Praha: Magnet-Press, 8.1998, 47(4), [38]-64, s. [38]. ISSN 0018-2583. Dostupné online
- LJUCA, Adin. Český guláš o bosenském maglajzu; Reflexe Bosny a Hercegoviny v českém akademickém prostředí (1992-2008). In: Bosna 1878-2008: [sborník příspěvků z konference konané ve dnech 29.-30. května 2008 v Ústí nad Labem]. Ústí nad Labem: Univerzita J.E. Purkyně, Ústav slovansko-germánských studií FF UJEP, 2009, s. 51-67. ISBN 978-80-7414-171-3
- Vídeňské illustrované noviny. Vídeň: A. Hrazdíra, 12.9.1918, 13(37), s. 9. ISSN 2521-5833. Dostupné online

=== Related Articles ===
- Austro-Hungarian rule in Bosnia and Herzegovina
- Battle of Maglaj (1878)

=== External links ===
- Článek o bitvě u Maglaje a Doboje na webu Náš region (2016)
- Vojenský historický ústav ČR
- Diplomová práce Cizincem ve službě – čeští úředníci v Bosně (FHS UK, 2020)
