= Gavrilo Rodić =

Austro-Hungarian general

Freiherr Gabriel von Rodich
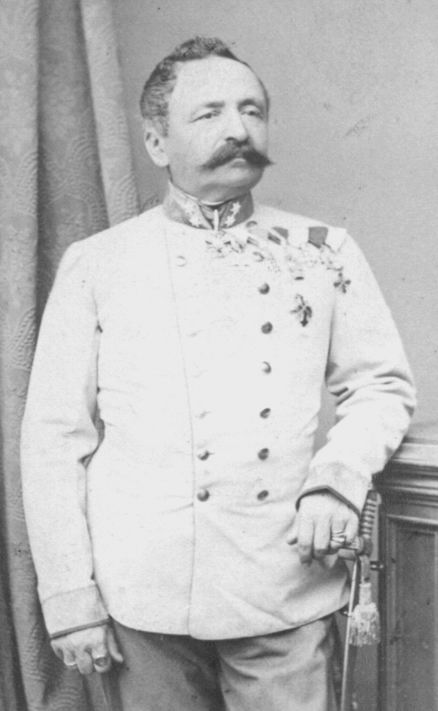

Imperial-Royal Lieutenant of the Kingdom of Dalmatia
- In office 1870–1881
- Preceded by: Julius Fluk von Leidenkron
- Succeeded by: Stjepan Jovanović

Personal details
- Born: 13 December 1812 Vrginmost, Illyrian provinces, First French Empire (modern-day Croatia)
- Died: 21 May 1890 (aged 81) Vienna, Austria-Hungary

Military service
- Allegiance: Austrian Empire; Austria-Hungary
- Branch/service: Austro-Hungarian Army
- Years of service: 1825–1881
- Rank: Feldzeugmeister
- Battles/wars: 1848 Revolutions; First Italian War of Independence; Austro-Prussian War; Great Eastern Crisis
- Awards: Military Order of Maria Theresia

Gavrilo or Gabriel Rodić, Freiherr (Baron) von Rodich, (13 December 1812 – 21 May 1890) was an Austro-Hungarian general in the Imperial Austrian and Austro-Hungarian Army, of Serbian descent.

== Biography ==
Rodić was born in Vrginmost, Habsburg Croatia, and raised as a devout Serbian Orthodox believer, but did not express a Serb nationality and instead devoted his life to service in the Austrian imperial army, like many others in their day.

He began his military career at the age of 14 when he was accepted into the cadet company at Graz. By 1847 he had achieved the rank of captain-lieutenant. The following year he was made a member of the Croatian ban Josip Jelačić's cabinet during the 1848 Revolutions. When the army of Croatia-Slavonia crossed the Drava to retake Međimurje, Rodić was appointed assistant to the ban's adjutant general. He later participated in fighting in Hungary. For his service during these years he received the title of Ritter in the Austrian court.

By 1859 Rodić was promoted to general-major. He was made brigade commander at Dubrovnik and later Kotor. He remained in Dalmatia until 1862. Afterwards he saw action against both Italian and Prussian forces. In the 1866 Austro-Prussian War, he was made an attached Feldmarschall-Lieutenant in the Army of the South (Südarmee) in Italy. He commanded the V Corps in the Battle of Custoza, and after this victory he was officially promoted to the rank of Feldmarschall-Lieutenant and awarded the Knight's Cross of the Military Order of Maria Theresia.

In 1869 he returned to Dalmatia as a military commander. He soon put down a rebellion in Kotor which helped him become governor of the Kingdom of Dalmatia in 1870. During his time as governor Rodić worked for the unification of Dalmatia with Croatia-Slavonia. During the Austro-Russian negotiations between the Treaty of San Stefano and the Treaty of Berlin he was proposed by Nikolai Pavlovich Ignatiev as the leader of an autonomous Macedonia within the Ottoman Empire. His forces took part in the occupation of Bosnia and Herzegovina in 1878.

He retired from this position and from military service in 1881 as a Feldzeugmeister. He returned to Vienna, where he died in 1890.

== See also ==
- Petar Preradović
- Svetozar Borojević
- Paul Davidovich
- Arsenije Sečujac
- Leonidas von Popp
- Paul von Radivojevich
- Peter Vitus von Quosdanovich
- Mathias Rukavina von Boynograd
- Maximilian Njegovan
