= Austro-Hungarian occupation of Bosnia and Herzegovina =

Austro-Hungarian occupation of Bosnia and Herzegovina may refer to:

- Austro-Hungarian campaign in Bosnia and Herzegovina in 1878
- Austro-Hungarian rule in Bosnia and Herzegovina from 1878 to 1918
