= Battle of Sarajevo =

Battle of Sarajevo can refer to:

- Battle of Sarajevo (1878)
- Sarajevo Operation
- Siege of Sarajevo
