= SMS Saida (1878) =

- Saida

Class overview
- Operators: Austro-Hungarian Navy
- Preceded by: SMS Donau
- Succeeded by: SMS Donau

History
- Name: Saida
- Builder: Pola Navy Yard, Pola
- Laid down: September 1876
- Launched: 2 July 1878
- Completed: 14 August 1879
- Renamed: Minerva, 1912
- Stricken: 26 February 1906
- Fate: Scrapped, 1920

General characteristics
- Type: Screw corvette
- Displacement: 2,662 long tons (2,705 t)
- Length: 79.44 m (260 ft 8 in)
- Beam: 13.14 m (43 ft 1 in)
- Draft: 6.11 m (20 ft 1 in)
- Installed power: 1,790 ihp (1,330 kW)
- Propulsion: 1 × marine steam engine; 1 × screw propeller
- Speed: 12 knots (22 km/h; 14 mph)
- Complement: 333–359
- Armament: 11 × 15 cm (5.9 in) Krupp guns; 1 × 7 cm (2.8 in) gun

SMS Saida was a screw corvette built for the Austro-Hungarian Navy in the 1870s. She was the only member of her class.

== Design ==
Saida was 79.44 m (260 ft 8 in) long overall, with a beam of 13.14 m (43 ft 1 in) and a draft of 5.83 m (19 ft 2 in) normally, which increased to 6.11 m (20 ft 1 in) at full load. The ship had a displacement of 2,662 long tons (2,705 t). Her crew varied over the course of her career, ranging from 333 to 359 officers and enlisted sailors.

The ship was powered by a single 2-cylinder, horizontal marine steam engine that drove a screw propeller. The number and type of boilers is not known, but smoke from the boilers was vented through a single funnel located amidships, between the fore- and main mast. The propulsion system was capable of generating 1,790 indicated horsepower (1,330 kW), for a top speed of 12 knots (22 km/h; 14 mph). The ship was fitted with a three-masted sailing rig to supplement the steam engine on long voyages.

Saida was armed with a main battery of eleven 15 cm (5.9 in) 25-caliber breechloading guns. She also carried a 7 cm (2.8 in), 15-caliber landing gun that could be taken ashore by a landing party. In 1892, two 25 mm (0.98 in) machine guns were installed. A further refit in 1904 reduced the number of 15 cm guns to eight, and the 25 mm machine guns were replaced by a pair of 47 mm (1.9 in), 33-caliber quick-firing guns.

== Service history ==
Saida was built at the Pola Navy Yard, beginning with her keel laying in September 1876. She was launched on 2 July 1878, and she was completed on 14 August 1879. By this time, the Austro-Hungarian Navy had begun a series of overseas cruises, and Saida was immediately sent to tour the West Indies, Brazil, and South Africa.

In 1884, Saida returned to South American waters, before crossing over to visit South Africa again, but this year, she continued on across the Indian Ocean to visit Australia, before returning home in 1886. After a brief respite, the ship got underway again later that year to visit South America and East Africa in another cruise that lasted until 1887. Her next major cruise began in 1888, which took the ship to the West Indies and North American ports. She arrived back in Pola in 1889.

Saida embarked on another major cruise, this time to the Pacific Ocean, from 1892 to 1894. During the trip, she visited ports in Australia, China, and Japan. She repeated the voyage in 1895–1897 during a circumnavigation of the globe, the sixth time an Austro-Hungarian vessel had accomplished the feat. In 1898, Saida was deployed to East Asian waters along with the screw corvette Frundsberg. The next year, the protected cruiser Kaiserin Elisabeth reinforced the flotilla, but all three ships were recalled later in 1899.

Saida was decommissioned in 1902. The ship was struck from the naval register on 26 February 1906. Saida was converted into a storage ship for naval mines in 1908, which included removing her engine. The ship was based in Pola. She was renamed Minerva in 1912 so her name could be used for the new scout cruiser Saida. Minerva remained in the fleet's inventory through World War I and after the end of the conflict in 1918, she was ceded to Italy as war reparations and broken up there in 1920.
