= SMS Saida =

Three ships of the Austro-Hungarian Navy have been named SMS Saida:

- SMS Saida (1855), a schooner launched in 1855
- SMS Saida (1878), a screw corvette launched in 1878
- SMS Saida (1912), a scout cruiser launched in 1912
