= Battle of Sarajevo (1878) =

1878 battle of the Austro-Hungarian campaign in Bosnia and Herzegovina

- Part of the Austro-Hungarian campaign in Bosnia and Herzegovina
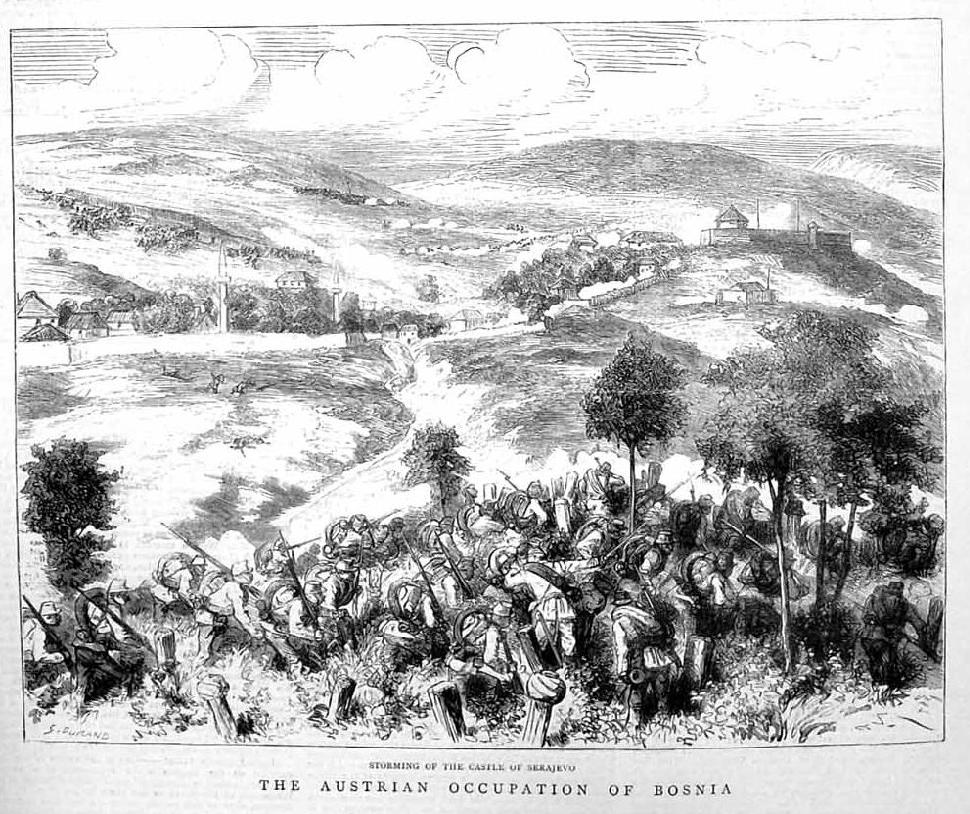
- The storming of the castle of Sarajevo
Date	19 August 1878
Location	Sarajevo, Bosnia and Herzegovina
Result	Austro-Hungarian victory

Belligerents
Austria-Hungary	Bosnia Vilayet

Commanders and leaders
(Austria-Hungary) Feldzeugmeister Josip Filipović (Austria-Hungary) Oberst Georg Lemaič (Austria-Hungary) General Müller (Austria-Hungary) Fieldmarshall Tegetthoff	Muhamed Hadžijamaković (executed); Hadži Lojo; Abdulah Kaukčija; Salih Saukčija Tučić; Mehmed Šeremet

Strength
14,000 men 52 Artillery batteries	6,000 Bosnian soldiers, an unknown number of artillery batteries The entire city's population

Casualties and losses
57 to 3,000 killed 314 wounded	300 to 3,000+ killed or wounded Unknown number of civilian casualties

At the end of the Russo-Turkish War during the Congress of Berlin, the Treaty of Berlin was established which in article 25 gave Austria-Hungary the responsibility to occupy and administer the Ottoman provinces of Bosnia and Herzegovina indefinitely while it still stayed under the sovereignty of the Ottoman Empire. A campaign was organized to establish Austro-Hungarian rule in Bosnia and Herzegovina on 29 July 1878 which saw mostly combat against local resistance fighters supported by the Ottoman Empire. The Austro-Hungarian army ultimately reached Sarajevo on 19 August 1878 and prepared to take the city.

== Preparations ==
The defenders were mostly Bosnian Muslims and Serbs who had overthrown the Ottoman authorities and seized the ammunition and Winchester, Martini Henry and Snider Rifles from the Ottoman garrisons before the arrival of the Austrians. They had also gained control over the Sarajevo castle and prepared Sarajevo for possible street-to-street fighting. Which included the hills surrounding the city and the mosques and houses. The total defending force consisted of 6,000 men within the Sarajevo population at the time of 50,000. The attacking Austrian force on the other hand had 14,000 troops available under feldzeugmeister Josip Filipović, which were divided into three sections to capture the city.

== Battle ==
On 19 August 1878 at 5 am, a thick fog hung over the city which the Austro-Hungarian armies took advantage of by sending a strong force from Radova to the north to approach Sarajevo. Meanwhile, another unit crept silently towards the nearby rebel held castle, which was protected by a three-meter high wall on the north side. Suddenly the fog lifted and the attackers were exposed and fired at by Bosniak artillery and guns. The Austro-Hungarian brigade which had advanced the furthest, was under the command of Oberst Lemaič and was soon pinned by enemy fire, halting the attack. His Hungarian units returned fire for 40 minutes until they ran out of ammo by late morning which the rebels noticed. Seeing an opportunity to chase the pinned brigade out of the city's vicinity, the rebels from the castle neared the brigade until they were 50 meters apart. At this point a Croatian unit from the brigade attacked the nearing rebels with a bayonet charge which drove them back to the Broška stream. The unit couldn't enforce many casualties on the fleeing rebels as they were out of ammo, so most rebels managed to escape back into the castle. By noon, Oberst Lemaič returned with nine fresh companies in an attempt to overrun the castle. The companies neared to 300 meters from the castle when they were again taken under heavy fire from enemy artillery and halted yet again. They had to stay put until aid would come in the form of their own artillery which was still making its way from Radova a few miles away.

The second force under General Müller on the other hand, had advanced from the west and managed to seize Sarajevo cemetery and Kosarko hill without struggle by 9 am. It was upon Kosarko hill that the Austrian Mountain Artillery Batteries were placed to fire upon the city, but the batteries were only light caliber and given the 2-mile distance from the city, they didn't end up doing much damage. The rebels saw the cannons on the hill and decided to attack it, as well as trying to use the surrounding houses as defensive positions to fire from. The 27th Graz house regiment was tasked with repelling the rebel attack and chase them out of the surrounding houses, which they accomplished after two hours of hand-to-hand combat. But this did not suffice to enable any further progress, so Müller and his men were also prevented from taking the city.

The third and final force under Fieldmarshall Tegetthoff defeated the rebels at the Miljačka river after heavy fighting and drove them back to the Sarajevo citadel. Once there the rebels used the city's walls and fortifications to pin the Austro-Hungarian force under a barrage of gunfire. Tegetthoff's force had now also been halted.

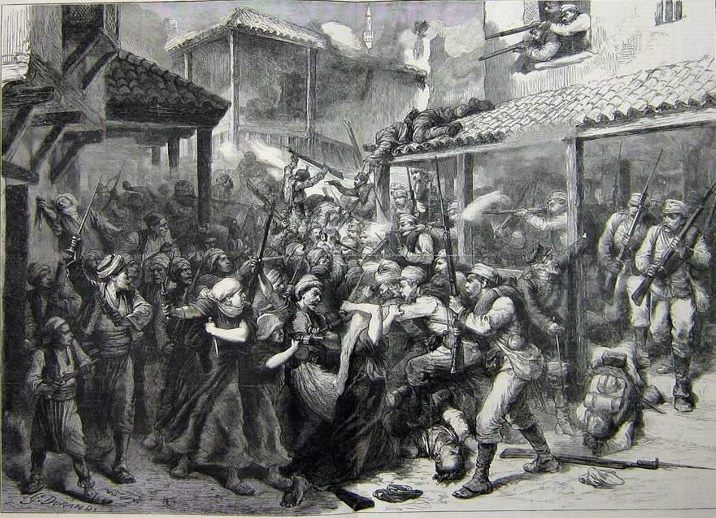
Austro-Hungarian forces in fierce combat against the rebels in the streets of Sarajevo.

After seven hours of nearly constant fighting, the rebels managed to halt all three Austro-Hungarian attack forces. But by noon the 52 guns from the Austro-Hungarian artillery finally arrived and were placed in a rough semicircle to the north east of Sarajevo near Pašino Brdo. They were aimed at the castle and the northern and western suburbs of Sarajevo. As they fired, half a battalion advanced from the western direction of Ilidža under the support of the shrapnel shelling which proved much more successful than the first attack forces. Two companies of the 52nd Hungarian regiment fixed their bayonets and charged the outer wall of the western suburbs. They were supported by regiments from the third battalion as they cleared the streets in house to house combat. It proved a difficult task as every street had been barricaded by the rebels and they poured fire on the Austro-Hungarian troops from every nook and crack from nearly every building. Even when the regiments had advanced beyond a couple of houses, they could still be shot in the back from either hidden gunmen or participating women and children in the houses. The 38th Hungarian infantry regiment took two hours to secure 500 meters of streets.

Little by little the Austro-Hungarian regiments pushed the rebels back into the more densely populated city center and as they reached the outskirts of the Muslim district, a bloody battle ensued. The rebels jumped down from the roofs of houses, brandishing daggers and knives to attack the advancing soldiers. In the heart of the Muslim district, the rebels had occupied the Ali Pasha's Mosque which the Austro-Hungarians failed to capture, even after five attempts. It was only when the Styrians from the 27th regiment arrived, that the mosque fell with 50 rebel casualties to mourn. Another section of the 27th regiment moved into the Serbian district and were immediately greeted by gunfire from the minaret of a mosque. Austro-Hungarian forces were even shot from behind as they were taking the konak (the Ottoman governor's palace). Even in the now burning city's wooden houses, the enemy was still fierce in their fighting. But by 13.30 pm, most rebels were driven out of the city towards Romanija and by the early evening Sarajevo ultimately fell.

In the north Lemaič was still stuck despite the successes in the west and south. It took him and his men another 6 hours to finally take the castle, from which they flew the imperial flag to signal victory at 17 pm. It had been twelve hours since the fighting had started between 14,000 Austro-Hungarian troops and 6,000 rebels, but the invading force prevailed and any surviving rebels were forced to flee to Pale. Meanwhile, the Austro-Hungarians celebrated as the 46th infantry regiment's band played the anthem Gott erhalte and Josip Filipović triumphantly marched into the Konak.

== Aftermath ==
Only four days after the conquest of Sarajevo on 23 August, feldzeugmeister Josip Filipović created a special court with summary judgement authority in Sarajevo. In the days following the creation of the court, nine Sarajevo Muslims which were accused of leading the rebels were hanged. Amongst them was Muhamed Hadžijamaković who was captured when he was making his way to the Konak to surrender to Filipović on 25 August. He was taken to trail and sentenced to death on that same day and taken to be hanged at 16 pm. Before he could be hanged, he took the revolver from one of his captors and managed to fire it twice, injuring several guards who eventually subdued him with a knife. The fatally injured and unconscious Hadžijamaković was ultimately hanged after sunset.

Fellow rebel leader Abdulah Kaukčija received the same fate after his court hearing on 24 August. The seven other executed men were Avdo Jabučica, Hadži Osman-aga Halačević, Suljo Kahvić, Hadži Mehaga Gačanica, Mehmed-aga Dalagija, Ibrahim-aga Hrga and Mešo Odobaša.
