= Anton Haus =

Austrian naval officer

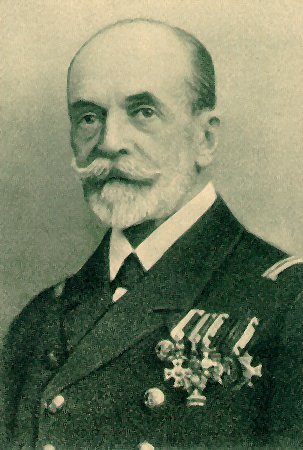
- Anton Haus in 1914
- Born: 13 June 1851; Tolmein, Austrian Empire (now Slovenia)
- Died: 8 February 1917 (aged 65); Pola, Austria-Hungary (now Croatia)
- Military career
- Allegiance: Austria-Hungary
- Branch: Austro-Hungarian Navy
- Service years: 1869–1917
- Rank: Grand Admiral
- Commands: Chef der Marinesektion (Commander of Navy) (February 1913-February 1917)
- Conflicts: First World War
- Awards: Military Order of Maria Theresa; Order of Leopold (Austria); Order of the Iron Crown (Austria); Order of Franz Joseph

Anton Johann Haus (13 June 1851 – 8 February 1917) was an Austrian naval officer. Despite his German name, he was born to a Slovenian-speaking family in Tolmein (now Tolmin, Slovenia). Haus was fleet commander of the Austro-Hungarian Navy in World War I and was the Navy's Grand Admiral from 1916 until his death.

== Biography ==
Haus entered the Navy in 1869. He distinguished himself as an instructor at the Imperial and Royal Naval Academy in Fiume (now Rijeka); a product of his academic study was Oceanography and Maritime Meteorology (1891). Returning to a seagoing command, Haus was commander of the corvette SMS Donau during the multinational intervention in the Boxer Rebellion in China in 1900/01. After the suppression of the insurrection Haus remained in Peking (now Beijing) until 1902.

Promoted to Vizeadmiral in 1907, Haus was Austro-Hungarian envoy to the second Hague Peace Conference from May to October of that year. Appointed Flotteninspekteur (Fleet Inspector) in 1912, Haus succeeded Rudolf Montecuccoli as Marinekommandant (Navy Commander) and Chef der Marinesektion (Chief of the Naval Section of the War Ministry) on 24 February 1913.

Perhaps unaware of the gravity of the situation, Haus was notably absent during the July Crisis of 1914. At the crucial crown council of 7 July 1914, where drastic action against Serbia was decided upon, Karl Kailer von Kaltenfels stood in for his chief. Upon the outbreak of war, Haus was named Flottenkommandant (Fleet Commander). When Italy entered the war, Haus sent the battle fleet to bombard Ancona and other Italian Adriatic ports on the night of 23/24 May 1915, but for the most part he left the active fighting to the light forces—fast cruisers, destroyers and submarines.

A shrewd naval strategist, Haus recognized that the real value of his battle fleet lay in maintaining its existence as a fleet in being to counter the threat of the Allied powers. His strategy received severe German criticism, but he was strongly supported by his own high command, including the Marineinspekteur, Archduke Charles Stephen of Austria. Like his German counterpart, Alfred von Tirpitz, Haus favored unrestricted submarine warfare.

In 1916 Haus became the only active-duty Austro-Hungarian naval officer (aside from members of the Imperial house) to be promoted to Grossadmiral (Grand Admiral). (His immediate successor, Maximilian Njegovan, was named a Grossadmiral in 1918, but on the retired list.)

Haus died of pneumonia in Pola (now Pula) on 2 February 1917 and was buried at the Naval Cemetery Pula (k.u.k. Marinefriedhof). Emperor Karl I attended the funeral and later conferred upon him the posthumous honour of Commander of the Military Order of Maria Theresa. With Pula under Italian sovereignty postwar, Haus's remains were transferred to Vienna in 1925.

Haus was succeeded as Marinekommandant and Flottenkommandant by Maximilian Njegovan and as Chef der Marinesektion by Karl Kailer von Kaltenfels; Njegovan was appointed to the latter post in April 1917 after the death of Kaltenfels. The fleet that Haus had so scrupulously maintained as a 'fleet in being' was parcelled out among the victorious powers after 1918.

== See also ==
- Mediterranean naval engagements during World War I

Military offices
Preceded by Rudolf Montecuccoli	Commander-in-Chief of the Austro-Hungarian Naval Fleet; 1913–1917	Succeeded by Maximilian Njegovan
