= Avdo Jabučica =

- Died: 6 September 1878; Sarajevo
- Occupations: gunsmith and watchmaker
- Known for: participation in Bosnian resistance to Austrian occupation of Ottoman Bosnia and Herzegovina

Avdo Jabučica was an Ottoman Bosnian blacksmith and armorer from Sarajevo, Sanjak of Bosnia, Ottoman Empire (modern-day Bosnia and Herzegovina).

In 1866, Jabučica forgered copper coins and was caught by the Ottoman authorities.

During the first days of the Austrian occupation of Bosnia and Herzegovina in 1878 Jabučica repaired two Krupp cannons which were activated to fight against invading Austrian troops. Later when he was arrested, Jabučica was forced to admit that he produced needles for artillery cannons but he denied his participation in the battles around Sarajevo.

Jabučica was put on court martial and sentenced to death. Jabučica was executed by shooting on 6 September 1878, together with many other participants in the resistance to occupying Austrian forces.

== Sources ==
- Imamović, Enver (1999). Historija bosanske vojske. Art 7. ISBN 978-9958-9732-1-5.
- Kreševljaković, Hamdija (1969). Sarajevo za vrijeme austrougarske uprave: (1878-1918). Arhiv grada Sarajeva.
