= Josip Filipović =

Croatian-Austrian army officer (1818–1889)

Josip Filipović Josef von Philippovich
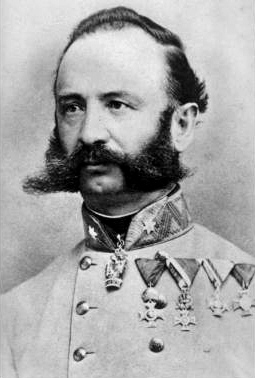
- Josip Filipović
- Born: 28 April 1819; Gospić, Croatian Military Frontier, Austrian Empire
- Died: 6 August 1889 (aged 70); Prague, Bohemia, Austria-Hungary
- Burial place: Olšany Cemetery
- Military career
- Allegiance: Austrian Empire; Austria-Hungary
- Rank: Feldzeugmeister
- Conflicts: 1848 Revolutions; Sardinian War; Austro-Prussian War: Bosnian Campaign; Battle of Maglaj; Battle of Čitluk; Battle of Stolac; Battle of Livno; Battle of Klobuk; Battle of Tuzla; Fall of Sarajevo

Josip Filipović, Freiherr (Baron) von Philippsberg, also Josef von Philippovich or Joseph Philippovich (28 April 1819 – 6 August 1889), was a Croatian nobleman, who rose to the rank of Austrian-Hungarian general (Feldzeugmeister).

== Life and career ==
Filipović was born in the Military Frontier town of Gospić in the Austrian Empire (now Croatia). He joined the Austrian Army in 1836 and became major in 1848. He fought under Josip Jelačić in Hungary, helping to quell the 1848 Revolutions.

He became colonel and commander of the 5th border regiment in 1857, and scored victories at the Battle of Solferino in 1859 and in the Austro-Prussian War in 1866. At one point He was commander of a Viennese division and for a short time was promoted from general to colonel general.

In 1859 he became major general and fought with the 6th corps in Italy, for which he was rewarded with the hereditary title of Freiherr. In 1866 he fought in Bohemia campaign with the 2nd corps.

Filipović moved further up through the ranks, stationed in Vienna, Tyrol, Vorarlberg and Brno, where he was made Feldzeugmeister in January 1874. In June 1874, he became the commander of the army in Bohemia, a position he would hold until his death.

In July 1878 he commanded the troops invading Bosnia and Herzegovina. After three months of battle his troops captured Sarajevo on 19 August, which then became the capital. The occupation of Herzegovina was assigned to his subordinate Feldmarschalleutnant Stjepan Jovanović. He returned to Vienna in 1880 and to Prague in 1882.

Filipović died in Prague in Austria-Hungary (now the Czech Republic). For his merits he was awarded the Commander's Cross of the Order of Maria Theresa in 1879.

Filipović had a younger brother Franjo Filipović who was also a general.

== See also ==
- List of Military Order of Maria Theresa recipients of Croatian descent
- List of Croatian soldiers
- Croatian nobility

New title	Governor of Bosnia and Herzegovina; July 13, 1878 - November 18, 1878	Succeeded by Wilhelm Nikolaus
