= Battle of Maglaj (1878) =

Military engagement between Austria-Hungary and the Ottoman Empire

- Part of the Austro-Hungarian campaign in Bosnia and Herzegovina
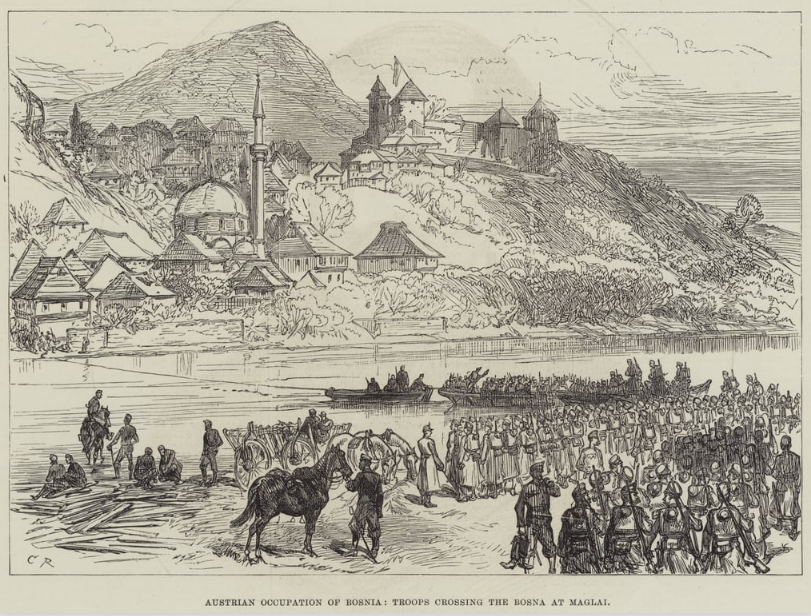
- Austrian Occupation of Bosnia: Troops crossing the Bosna at Maglai (The Illustrated London News, 1878)
Date	3–5 August 1878
Location	Maglaj, Bosnia and Herzegovina
Result	Austro-Hungarian victory

Belligerents
Austria-Hungary	Ottoman Empire: Bosnia Vilayet

Commanders and leaders
(Austria-Hungary) Josip Filipović	Unknown

Casualties and losses
50+ killed	Heavy

The Battle of Maglaj was a military engagement between Austria-Hungary and the Ottoman Empire that took place on 3–5 August 1878 as part of the Austro-Hungarian military campaign in Bosnia and Herzegovina in the Bosnian vilayet for control of the strategic town of Maglaj. The Austro-Hungarian expeditionary Force was surprised by the stiff resistance of the Bosnian Muslims when crossing the Bosnia River near the city, and managed to gain control of the area only after a secondary combat strike.

The ferocity of the fighting at Maglaj subsequently became popular among the soldiers, and thanks to returning Czech soldiers, it penetrated into the Czech language by establishing the term maglajs as something disordered and confusing.

== Before ==
From June 13 to July 13, 1878, the Congress of Berlin, attended by representatives of Austria-Hungary, the German Empire, the United Kingdom, Russian Empire, the Ottoman Empire, and Kingdom of Italy, which resolved the so-called Great Eastern Crisis in the Balkans, among others. It was agreed that Bosnian vilayet would be temporarily occupied and administered by Austria-Hungary at the expense of the Ottoman Empire in order to maintain political and ethnic stability in the region. On July 29, 1878, XIII. the army corps of the Austro-Hungarian Expeditionary Force under the command of General Josip Filipović, who had the supreme command over the entire military operation, crossed the Sava river in several places and began to occupy the territory of the Bosnian vilayet.

The Imperial Army advanced into the area from the northern border towards the south, meeting little military resistance. The Austro-Hungarian command did not even count on significant resistance and could easily underestimate the combat situation.

== Battle ==
On 2 August, the Austro-Hungarian advance cavalry units of the Hungarian Hussars of the 7th Regiment arrived at the banks of the Bosna river in the central Bosnian region. A unit of hussars crossed the river, but was ambushed by Bosnian-Ottoman units upon entering the city, and the subsequent clash resulted in significant combat losses in the number of about fifty fallen horsemen.

The recapture of the city, necessary to gain control over the strategically important river crossing by boat, took place after the intervention of the troops of the main army, especially the infantry. On August 5, two battalions of Maroičič's infantry regiment went against the Ottoman positions near Maglaj, in an action led by Lieutenant Colonel Pytel, along the right bank of Bosnia to Maglaj. In the lead, 2 battalions of the infantry regiment of Archduke František Karl advanced across the Kosma, then two battalions of the Ilartungov regiment advanced through the neighboring heights to attack the enemy's flank. In the afternoon, these three Austrian corps reached Maglaj, where they attacked the Bosnian-Ottoman positions and, thanks to their numerical and technical (artillery) superiority, forced the enemy to retreat. They subsequently occupied the city and Lt. Col. Pytel raised the Austro-Hungarian flag here.

Austro-Hungarian sources list the number of losses from the second clash on the enemy side at over 50 dead, their own losses are listed as 3 dead and 6 wounded. Several Bosnian-Ottoman prisoners were executed as they were identified as direct participants in the attack on the Austro-Hungarian cavalry on 2 August.

== Aftermath ==
The action constituted one of the most significant clashes of the entire Austro-Hungarian military campaign, alongside for example the battle of Doboj on September 2, culminating in the capture of Sarajevo in September and ending on October 20, 1878, when the campaign was officially ended, Bosnian partisan units operating in the mountains, surrendered and the original Bosnian vilayet thus disappeared. The subsequent presence of Austro-Hungarian power in Bosnia and Herzegovina persisted through the so-called Bosnian Crisis until the end of World War I, including the crucial assassination of Archduke Franz Ferdinand in Sarajevo on June 28, 1914.
