= Abdulvehab Ilhamija =

- The handbook, Bosnian Book of the Science of Conduct is a work that lists 54 religious duties, published in 1831 by the Bosnian author and poet Abdulvehab Žepčevi, also known as Ilhamija
- Born: 1773; Žepče, Bosnia Eyalet, Ottoman Empire
- Died: 1821 (aged 48); Travnik, Bosnia Eyalet, Ottoman Empire

Abdulvehab Ilhamija Žepčevi (1773 – 1821) was a Bosnian dervish and prose writer.

In addition to Bosnian, his work was written in Turkish, Arabic and Persian.

== Name ==
His name Abd-ul-vehhab means "Servant of the Generous" — one of the attributes of God. Ilhamija, his Dervish name, means "inspired."

== Early life ==
Ilhamija was born into a Muslim Bosniak family in Žepče, Sanjak of Bosnia, Ottoman Empire (today's Bosnia and Herzegovina). His father's name was Abdulvehab. Both his parents died during his youth. A quote from one of his poems is "A mother I do not have, and my father I do not remember."

Ilhamija was educated in his birth town and in Tešanj and Fojnica. He also attended the Ferhadija Mosque in Tešanj.

His final work, the Bosnian Book of the Science of Conduct, is a work that lists 54 religious duties that each follower of Islam must know about, believe in, and fulfill, followed by advice on what a religious person should and should not do. It was published posthumously in 1831, a decade after his death. The book is printed in Arebica, the variant of Perso-Arabic script used to write Bosnian language, mainly between the 16th and 20th centuries, after the conquest of Bosnia by the Ottoman Empire.

== Execution ==
In the year 1820, a man named Dželaludin-paša became the Ottoman pasha of Bosnia, a title he would hold until his brutal death in 1821. At first, Abdulvehab Ilhamija supported Dželaludin, believing him to be a fair and just ruler. But over a short period of time the illusion faded and Abdulvehab Ilhamija openly criticized Dželaludin's harsh rule over the Bosnian population in his poetry and writings.

In 1821, Dželaludin became aware of Ilhamija's criticisms and invited him to his home in Travnik. Ilhamija traveled without a horse, on foot from Žepče to Travnik. Before he left, he bid a final farewell to his family and friends, anticipating a grim ending to his meeting with the pasha.

To this day, what happened in Travnik remains in the sphere of assumption. There is a legend that says that Dželaludin-paša asked of Ilhamija to renounce his critical writings, when Ilhamija refused to do so, he was either strangled to death or decapitated in the Travnik Castle.

News of his death was received with sorrow and revolt among the people. He was buried in Travnik in mausoleum near a former railway station and former hospital, where he remained buried for 138 years until 1959, when his bones and headstone were moved to a different grave.

== Partial list of works ==
The publication years for his works remains unknown.

- Boga traži i plači (Seek God and Cry)
- Čudan zeman nastade (There Was a Strange Zeman)
- Dervišluk je čudan rahat (Being a Dervish is a Strange Comfort)
- Dobro ti ders nadgledaj! (Look at Your Lessons Well!)
- Dženet saraj (Heavenly Palace)
- Hajat dok je... (While Life Is...)
- Hajde sinak te uči (Come and Learn, Son)
- Ja upitah svog Jasina (I Asked My Soul)
- Ne rastaj se od sufara
- Potlje Boga...
- Uči, sinak, i piši! (Learn, Son, and Write!)
- Ustrajte u sticanju znanja! (Persevere in Gaining Knowledge!)
- Bosnian Book of the Science of Conduct (1831); published posthumously

== In popular culture ==
Fellow Bosniak writer Muhamed Hadžijamaković wrote a biography of Abdulvehab Ilhamija entitled Ilhamija: Život i djelo (Ilhamija: Life and Work).

Rešad Kadić (1912–1988) wrote a book about Abdulvehab Ilhamija's death entitled Ilhamijin put u smrt (Ilhamija's Journey to Death), originally published in 1976.
