= Leonidas von Popp =

- Leonida Pop
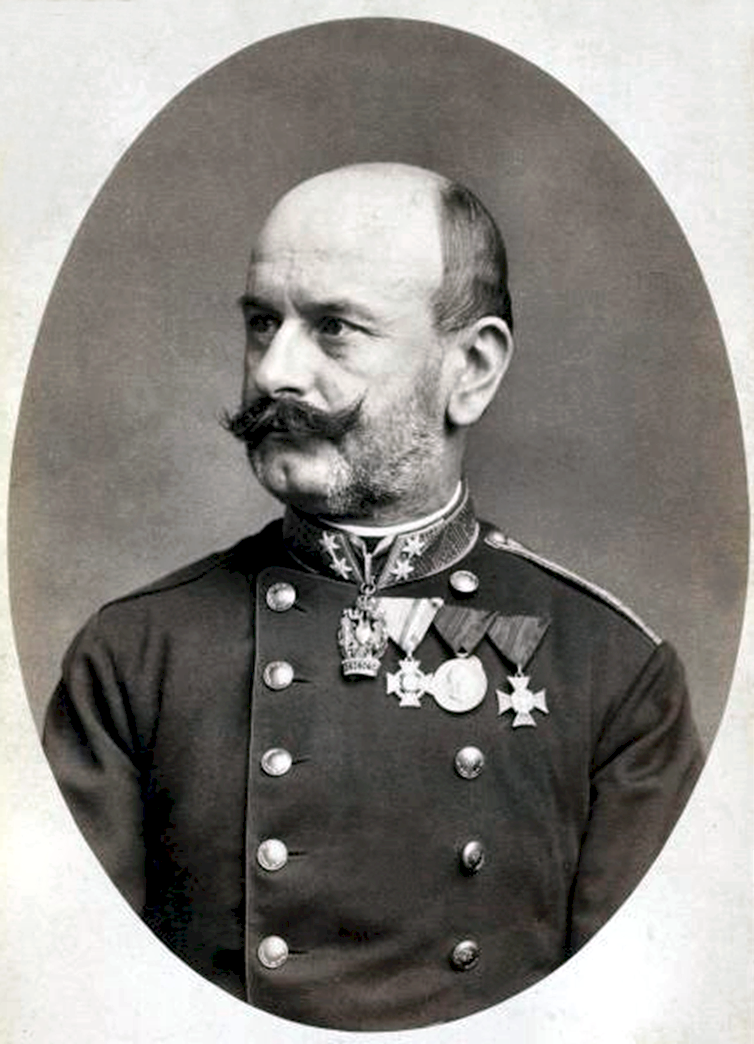
- Baron Leonida Pop as Lieutenant field marshal, 1885
- Born: October 15, 1831; Năsăud, Austrian Empire
- Died: December 1, 1908 (aged 77); Baden, Austria-Hungary
- Military career
- Allegiance: Austrian Empire; Austria-Hungary
- Branch: Imperial Austrian Army; Austro-Hungarian Army
- Service years: 1851–1889
- Rank: Feldzeugmeister; General of Infantry
- Commands: 15th Infantry Brigade; Military Chancery of the Emperor
- Conflicts: Second Italian War of Independence: Battle of Magenta; Battle of Turbigo; Austro-Prussian War Austro-Hungarian campaign in Bosnia and Herzegovina in 1878
- Awards: Order of the Iron Crown (1st Class); Order of the Crown of Romania (Grand Cross)

Chief of the Military Chancery of His Imperial and Royal Apostolic Majesty
- In office 1 July 1881 – 17 March 1889
- Monarch: Franz Joseph I
- Preceded by: Friedrich von Beck-Rzikowsky
- Succeeded by: Arthur Freiherr von Bolfras

Leonidas Freiherr von Popp (born Leonida Pop, Hungarian: Báró Popp Leonidász; 15 October 1831 – 1 December 1908) was an Austro-Hungarian officer of Romanian origin who rose to the rank of Feldzeugmeister (later re-designated General of Infantry) and served as General Adjutant to Emperor Franz Joseph I and head of the Imperial Military Chancery.

== Early life and background ==
Leonida Pop was born on 15 October 1831 in Năsăud, Transylvania (then part of the Austrian Empire), into a prominent family of border guards (grăniceri) of Romanian Greek Catholic confession.

His grandfather, Grigore Pop (1762–1851), originated from Bichigiu and was the first Romanian officer in the 2nd Romanian Border Regiment based in Năsăud. Grigore had four sons: Ion, Matei, Gavrilă, and Leon. Leon Pop (1797–1880), the father of Leonidas, served in the same border regiment and fought in the Napoleonic Wars. Leon married the daughter of an Austrian officer in the regiment, Major Wurzer. Together they had four children: three daughters (Laura, Matilda, and Ida) and one son, Leonida. His sister Ida married J. Goldschmidt, and her daughters subsequently married notable local figures in Năsăud. Leon took part in the Hungarian Revolution of 1848 on the side of the Romanian revolutionaries in Transylvania and, according to George Barițiu, he was later wrongfully prosecuted, then released.

Pop completed his primary education and initial military training at the Military Institute in Năsăud. In 1843, at the age of 13, he accompanied his father to Vienna, where they were granted an audience with Emperor Ferdinand I. Impressed by the young boy's intellect and quick wit, the Emperor granted him admission to the prestigious Theresian Military Academy in Wiener Neustadt, an institution typically reserved for the high nobility.

== Early military career ==
Pop graduated from the Theresian Military Academy in 1851 as an outstanding cadet. He was commissioned as a second lieutenant and assigned to the 51st Infantry Regiment "Karl Ferdinand", garrisoned in Cluj and later Sibiu, where he served as an adjutant until 1854.

In 1855, he was admitted to the Higher Staff Course (Kriegsschule) in Vienna, graduating in 1857 with the rank of lieutenant and a strong reputation in military strategy and tactics. By 1858, he was promoted to captain within the General Staff.

During the Second Italian War of Independence (1859), Pop participated in the Battle of Magenta and Battle of Turbigo. His tactical contributions were key to operational successes, earning him the Knight's Cross of the Grand Ducal Hessian Order of Merit and the Military Merit Cross with War Decoration (later commemorated in 1890 with the Signum Laudis).

During the Austro-Prussian War (1866), Pop was commended by Emperor Franz Joseph "with highest expression of satisfaction" for his bravery and was promoted to major. On 13 November 1866, he was appointed Chief of Staff of the 14th Infantry Division in Pressburg. He was promoted to lieutenant colonel in the General Staff on 19 September 1869 (backdated to 23 April of that year).

Recognized for his tactical acumen, Pop served as a professor of strategy, fortifications, and technical services at the Central Cavalry School in Vienna. On 1 September 1875, he was promoted to colonel and assumed command of Infantry Regiment No. 61 (and subsequently No. 48). In June 1876, he became Chief of Staff to the General Command in Agram.

== High command and Imperial Chancery ==
In August 1878, Colonel Pop was appointed Chief of the Operations Chancery for the 5th Army, taking part in the Austro-Hungarian occupation of Bosnia and Herzegovina. Following this, in August 1879, he took command of the 15th Infantry Brigade. On 1 May 1880, he was promoted to major general (General-Major) and assigned to direct fortification projects in Trieste.

For his distinguished service, Emperor Franz Joseph I awarded Pop the Order of the Iron Crown (1st Class) in 1881, created him a Baron (Freiherr), and named him a Privy Councillor (Geheimrat).

On 12 April 1881, Pop was named Chief of the Military Chancery (Militärkanzlei), and on 11 June 1881, Emperor Franz Joseph appointed him President of the Chancery and General Adjutant (Generaladjutant) to the Sovereign. He was the first and only ethnic Romanian from Transylvania to hold this position.

On 1 November 1885, while serving as General Adjutant, Pop was promoted to Field Marshal Lieutenant (Feldmarschalleutnant). On this occasion, King Carol I of Romania decorated him with the Grand Cross of the Order of the Crown of Romania.

In March 1889, severe illness forced him to step back from active duties, and he sought treatment at a health resort in Switzerland. On 2 December 1898, the Emperor conferred upon him the rank of Feldzeugmeister (re-designated as General of Infantry on 15 November 1908).

== Death and burial ==
Baron von Popp died on 1 December 1908 in Baden, Austria, at the age of 77.

In his will, he requested cremation. Because cremation was not permitted in Vienna at the time, his remains were transferred to Ulm, Germany, for cremation. His ashes were subsequently brought back to his hometown of Năsăud and placed in an urn inside the Goldschmidt family vault. (During the communist era, the vault was damaged and the urn broken, scattering his ashes near the family site).

His original gravestone bore the Latin inscription:

Feldgeneralhofmeister Baron Leonidas von Popp 1831–1908.
"Latuosque decet cui dicet in diem dixise: Vixi!"
("It is fitting to say of great men throughout the ages: I have lived!")

== Legacy and historical perception ==
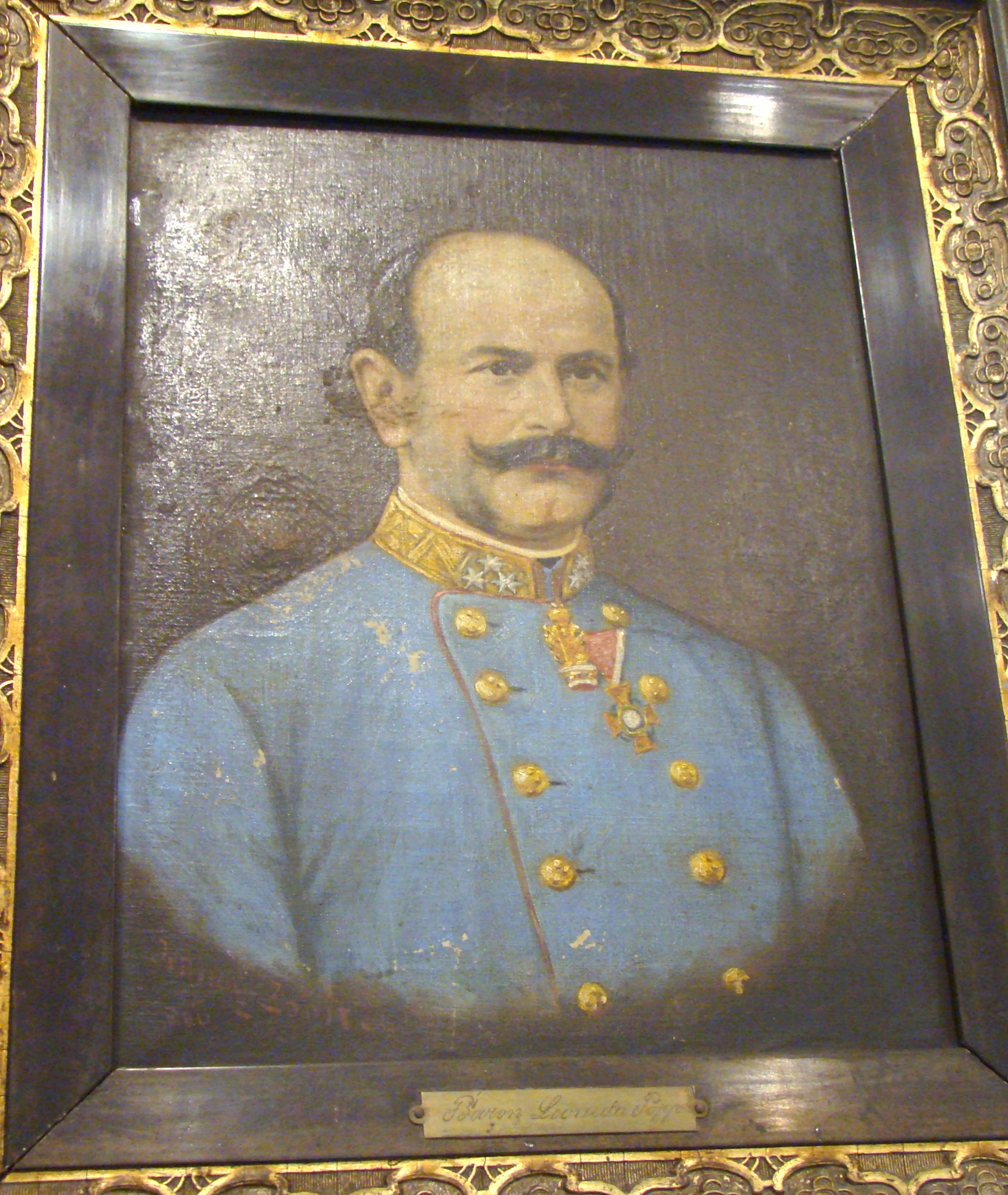
Portrait of Popp at the Năsăud Grenz infantry Museum

Pop maintained personal ties to Năsăud throughout his life, frequently visiting his birthplace and family. However, his political stance was a subject of debate among contemporary Transylvanian Romanians.

While viewed locally as a point of pride due to his high rank, Romanian nationalist circles in Transylvania often viewed him as assimilated or distant from the Romanian national cause. In an obituary published in Gazeta Transilvaniei, the editorial noted that while Pop was of Romanian origin, he operated purely as a loyal soldier to the Emperor rather than using his proximity to the Crown to influence imperial policy in favor of the Romanian population:

It was a rare thing for a Romanian to make the military career that Leonida Pop made... To the question of how this distinguished officer, so close to the ruler, could not exert influence in favor of his people, the clearest answer is that while the deceased was indeed of Romanian origin, he did not have—or perhaps did not dare to have—Romanian national feelings. He was a faithful soldier of the Emperor and showed great diligence in his service, both in peace and in war.

— Gazeta Transilvaniei

However, professor Ioan Seni from the George Coșbuc National College (Năsăud) claims that Popp was really interested in the life of the Năsăud Romanians and proposed the erection of a statue of Popp in 2011.

== Honors and awards ==
Baron von Popp received numerous domestic and foreign decorations during his career:

=== Austro-Hungarian Empire ===
- Order of the Iron Crown, 1st Class (1881)
- Military Merit Cross with War Decoration (1859)
- Military Merit Medal (Signum Laudis) on the ribbon of the Military Merit Cross (1890)
- Imperial Privy Councillor (Geheimrat)

=== Kingdom of Romania ===
- Grand Cross of the Order of the Crown of Romania (1885)

=== Foreign Honors ===
- Knight's Cross of the Grand Ducal Hessian Order of Merit (1859)
- Grand Cross of the Order of the Crown of Italy
- Prussian Order of the Red Eagle
- Prussian Order of the Crown, 1st Class
- Order of Frederick (Kingdom of Württemberg)
- Commander's Cross with Star of the Order of Charles III (Spain)
- Order of Saint Olav (Norway)
- Order of Prince Danilo I, 1st Class (Montenegro)
- Order of Saint Anna, 1st Class (Russian Empire)
