= Muhamed Hadžijamaković =

- Born: 1814 or 1815; Sarajevo, Bosnia Eyalet, Ottoman Empire
- Died: 25 August 1878 (aged 63–64); Sarajevo, Bosnia Vilayet, Ottoman Empire
- Cause of death: Executed by Austro-Hungarian troops
- Spouse: Twice married
- Children: 6

Muhamed Hadžijamaković (1814 or 1815 – 25 August 1878) was one of the Bosnian Muslim leaders striving for the Bosnia Vilayet autonomy within the Ottoman Empire in the 1860s and 1870s.

== Early life and family ==
Hadžijamaković was born in Sarajevo into a family of Bosniak Janissary descendants. His father's name was Mehmed, but his mother's name is not known. Hadžijamaković had a brother named Sejf-aga and two sisters named Nesiba and Hasiba.

He married twice; the first marriage produced two daughters, Umihana and Fatima. The second marriage produced three sons and a daughter.

== Austro-Hungarian Empire ==
He ardently opposed the Austro-Hungarian occupation of the Bosnia Vilayet in 1878 and eventually became one of the main organizers of the armed resistance in Sarajevo to the invading Austro-Hungarian Army. He requested the Ottoman Sultan Abdul Hamid II for support which never arrived. He was eventually captured and executed by the Austro-Hungarians.

== Death ==
In the aftermath of the Battle of Sarajevo, Hadžijamaković was captured when he was making his way to the Konak to surrender to Filipović on 25 August. He was taken to trail and sentenced to death on that same day and taken to be hanged at 16 pm. Before he could be hanged, he took the revolver from one of his captors and managed to fire it twice, injuring several guards who eventually subdued him with a knife. The fatally injured and unconscious Hadžijamaković was ultimately hanged after sunset.

== Works ==
Hadžijamaković wrote a biography of poet Abdulvehab Ilhamija entitled Ilhamija: Život i djelo (Ilhamija: Life and Work).
