= Stjepan Jovanović =

Austrian military personnel (1828–1885)

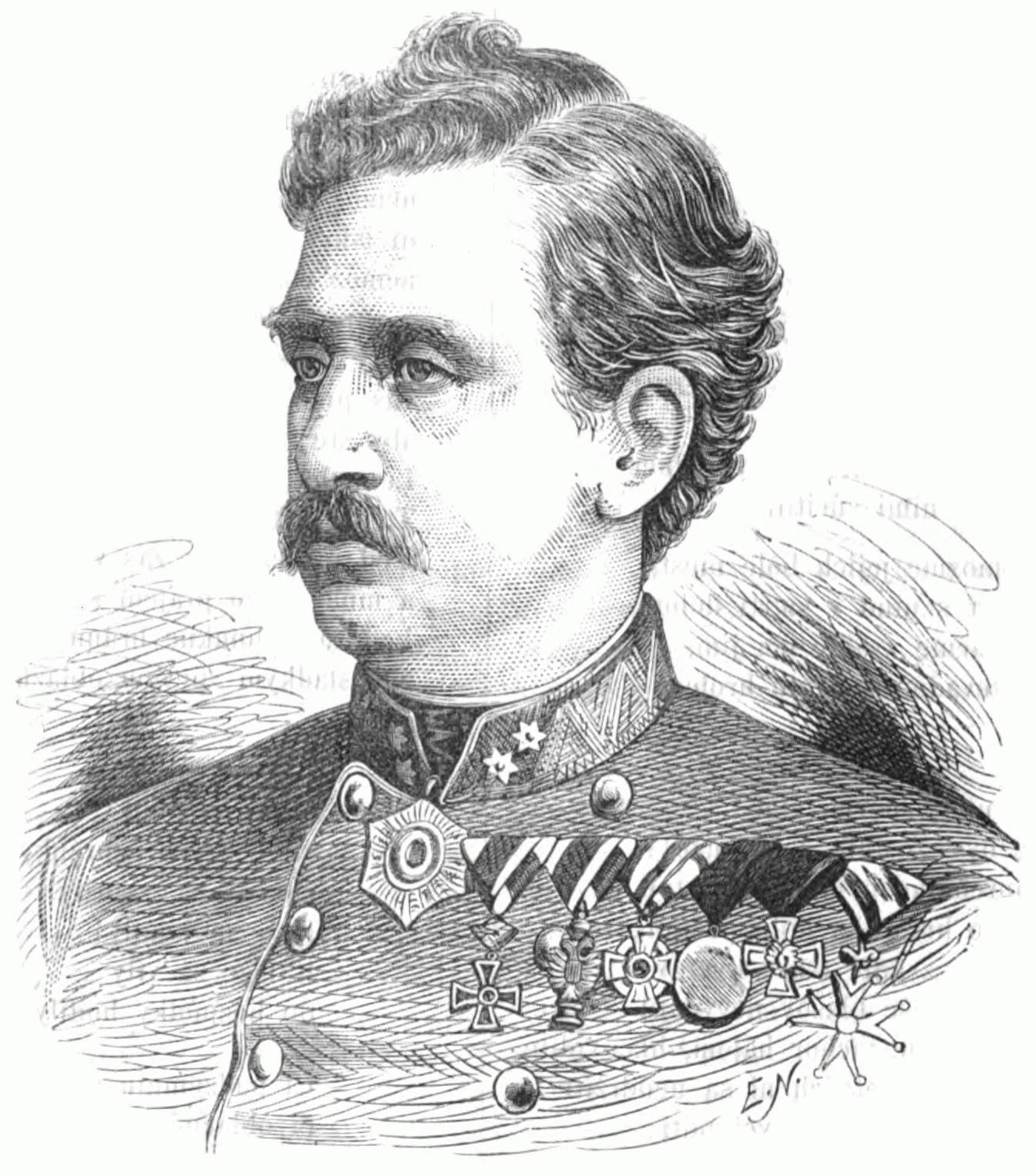
Baron Stjepan Jovanović

Stjepan Jovanović (Stephan Freiherr (Baron) von Jovanovich; 5 January 1828 – 8 December 1885) was a military commander of the Austrian Empire from the Croatian Military Frontier.

== Biography ==
Jovanović was born in the village of Pazarište near Gospić in Lika (then Croatian Military Frontier, Austrian Empire, today Croatia). He joined the Austrian army in 1845 and during 1848–1849 fought under general Radetzky in Italy. In 1850 he was transferred to the General staff and later served as an adjutant of general Gabriel Rodić in southern Dalmatia.

Between 1861 and 1865 Jovanović served as Austrian consul general in Sarajevo. Because of his knowledge of Bosnia, Herzegovina, Montenegro and Krivošije, he was recalled back into the army in 1865, as a colonel. In 1866, during the Austro-Prussian War he fought in Italy under Archduke Albert. During the 1869 insurrection in Boka Kotorska, he commanded a Gebirgsjäger (mountain troops) brigade in Kotor (Cattaro) that tried to suppress the uprising, but failed militarily and instead negotiated an amnesty for the rebels.

In 1875 Stjepan Jovanović was given the noble title of Freiherr. In 1876 he was named a Feldmarschallleutnant.

In 1877 he commanded the 18th division in Split (Spalato). A year later he was commanding the occupation of Herzegovina. Later he served as military commander in Herzegovina, governor of Dalmatia and military commander of Zadar (Zara).

He died in 1885 in Zadar. His grave and monument is in the Military graveyard in Dubrovnik.

== See also ==
- List of Military Order of Maria Theresa recipients of Croatian descent
- List of Croatian soldiers
- Croatian nobility
