= Grand admiral =

Historic naval rank

Grand admiral is a historic naval rank. It is the highest rank in the several European navies that used it, and is best known for its use in Germany as Großadmiral. A comparable rank in modern navies is that of admiral of the fleet.

== Grand admirals in individual navies ==
=== Austria-Hungary ===
Grand admiral: Großadmiral (German); Tengernagy (Hungarian)
- Command flag

- Sleeve insignia
- Country: Austria-Hungary
- Service branch: Austro-Hungarian Navy
- Formation: 1916
- Abolished: 1918
- Next lower rank: Admiral

The Austrian grand admirals were all members of the Imperial family, except for Anton Haus, the commander of the Austro-Hungarian Navy for part of World War I:

Portrait	Name (born–died)	Appointed	Ref.
	Anton Haus (1851–1917)	12 May 1916	
	Kaiser; Charles I of Austria (1887–1922)	1 November 1916	
	Kaiser; Wilhelm II of Germany (1859–1941)	22 February 1917	

=== France ===
In Bourbon Restoration France, the rank was an honorific one equivalent to that of marshal in the French Army.

=== Germany ===
Grand admiral Großadmiral
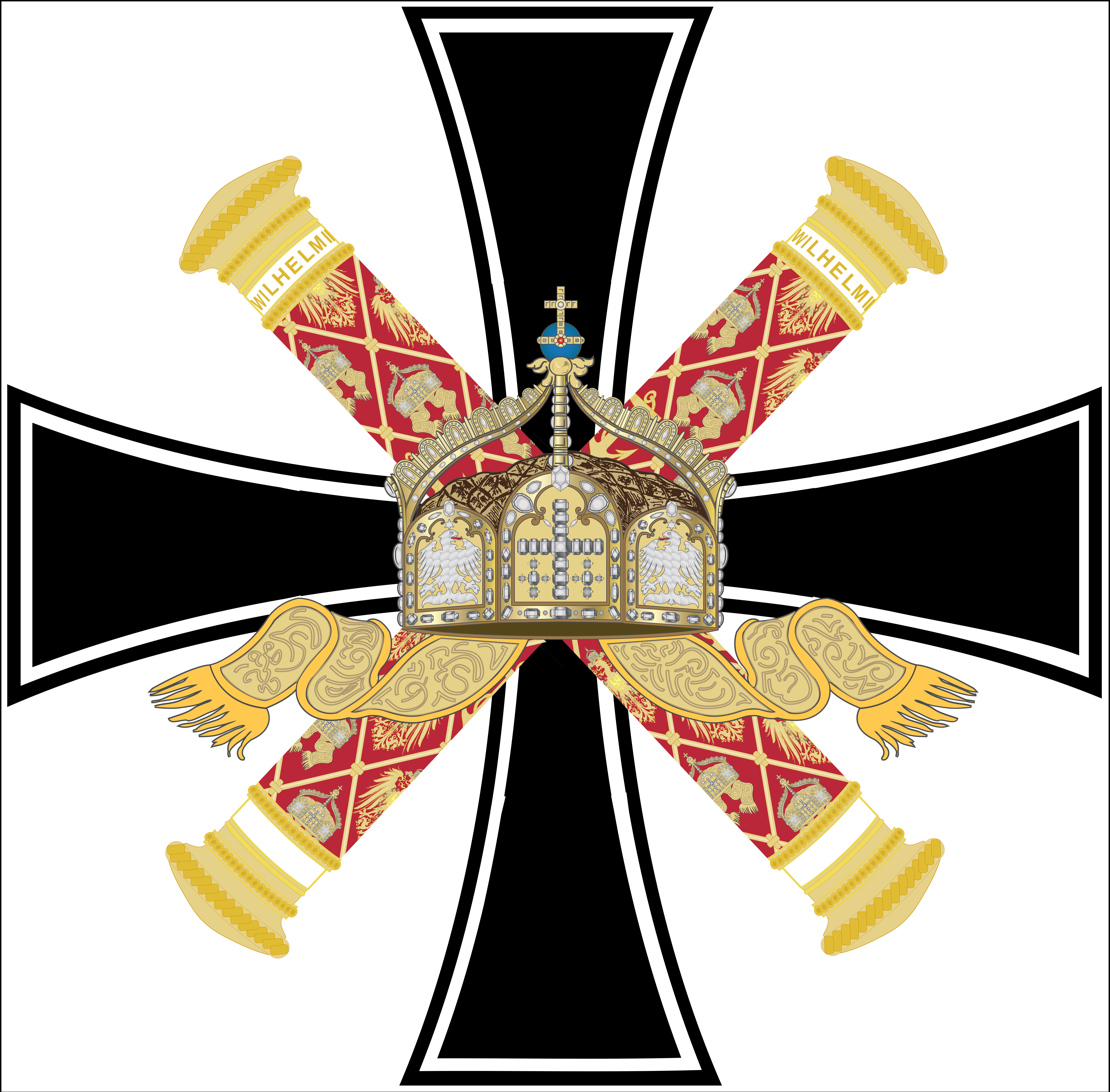
- Großadmiral rank flag (1900–1918)

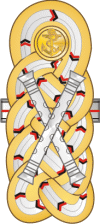
- Shoulder board and sleeve
- Country: German Empire
- Service branch: Imperial German Navy
- Rank group: Flag officer
- Formation: 1900
- Abolished: 1918
- Next lower rank: Admiral
- Equivalent ranks: Generalfeldmarschall

In the Imperial German Navy, and later in the Kriegsmarine, the rank Großadmiral was the equivalent of a British admiral of the fleet or a United States fleet admiral; as a five-star rank (OF-10). Its holders were authorised to carry a baton.

The rank was created in 1901 and discontinued in 1945, by which time a total of eight men had been promoted to it. The next most junior rank was Generaladmiral (admiral-general).

==== Imperial Germany ====
Before and during World War I, the following were made grand admirals of the Imperial German Navy (Kaiserliche Marine):

Portrait	Name (born–died)	Appointed	Ref.
	King; Edward VII of the United Kingdom (1841–1910)	26 June 1902	
	Hans von Koester (1844–1928)	28 June 1905	
	King; Oscar II of Sweden (1829–1907)	13 July 1905	
	Prince; Henry of Prussia (1862–1929)	4 September 1909	
	Alfred von Tirpitz (1849–1930)	27 January 1911	
	Henning von Holtzendorff (1853–1919)	31 July 1918	

==== Nazi Germany ====
Grand admiral Großadmiral
- Großadmiral rank flag (1939–1945)

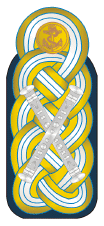
- Shoulder board and sleeve
- Country: Nazi Germany
- Service branch: Kriegsmarine
- Rank group: Flag officer
- Formation: 1939
- Abolished: 1945
- Next lower rank: Generaladmiral
- Equivalent ranks: Generalfeldmarschall

Großadmiral was the most senior rank of the Kriegsmarine, immediately senior to Generaladmiral. The rank was reintroduced in 1939 and held only by the Commander-in-Chief of the Kriegsmarine.

Portrait	Name (born–died)	Appointed	Ref.
	Erich Raeder (1876–1960)	1 April 1939	
	Karl Dönitz (1891–1980)	30 January 1943	

=== Italy ===
The rank of grand admiral (Italian: Grande ammiraglio) was created by Benito Mussolini in 1924. It was established primarily to honour Paolo Thaon di Revel, who had been head of the Italian Regia Marina during World War I — he was the only person to be awarded the rank. It was equivalent to marshal of Italy in the army and also marshal of the Air Force.

=== Peru ===
In 1967 the rank of Grand Admiral of Peru (Spanish: Gran Almirante del Perú) was awarded posthumously to Miguel Grau Seminario and is equivalent to the army rank of Grand Marshal of Peru.

=== Sweden ===
In Sweden the rank of grand admiral was only ever awarded twice. Once to Duke Charles (later king Charles XIII), who was given the title at birth and which was used by him as the commander of the Swedish Royal Navy and once to crown prince Oscar (I) as a courtesy title to honour his adoptive grandfather, the late king Charles XIII.

=== Turkey ===
Grand Admiral (Turkish: Büyük Amiral) is nominally a rank in the Turkish Navy. It is the equivalent of the ranks of field marshal in the Army and Air Force. Since the foundation of the Republic in 1923, no person has held the rank. It is awarded by the Grand National Assembly of Turkey to persons who are holding the rank of admiral and displayed distinguished merit in wartime.

== In fiction ==
Among the grand admirals appearing in fiction and science fiction, one notable figure is Grand Admiral Thrawn from the Star Wars science fiction franchise.
