= SMS Tegetthoff =

Two ships of the Austro-Hungarian Navy have been named SMS Tegetthoff after the Austrian admiral Wilhelm von Tegetthoff:

- SMS Tegetthoff (1878), a central battery ironclad launched in 1878 and serving as a local defence battleship and training vessel during World War I after being renamed Mars.
- SMS Tegetthoff (1912), lead ship of the Tegetthoff class of battleships, launched in 1912.
