= Kriegsschule =

Kriegsschule (German: "war school") can refer to:

- Kriegsschule (Wehrmacht), starting in the 17th-century German war schools taught German nobles higher education and war games
- Kriegsschule (Austria), the Vienna-based military academy where officers of the army of the Austrian Empire and later the Imperial Austro-Hungarian army received training from 1852 until 1918
