= SMS Donau (1893) =

- Donau

Class overview
- Operators: Austro-Hungarian Navy
- Preceded by: SMS Saida
- Succeeded by: None

History
- Name: Donau
- Builder: Pola Navy Yard, Pola
- Laid down: October 1888
- Launched: 28 June 1893
- Completed: August 1894
- Fate: Ceded to Yugoslavia, 1920

History
- Name: Sibenik
- Acquired: 1920

General characteristics
- Type: Screw corvette
- Displacement: 2,306 long tons (2,343 t)
- Length: 70 m (229 ft 8 in)
- Beam: 12.84 m (42 ft 2 in)
- Draft: 5.56 m (18 ft 3 in)
- Propulsion: 1 × marine steam engine; 1 × screw propeller
- Complement: 333
- Armament: 10 × 12 cm (4.7 in) guns; 1 × 7 cm (2.8 in) gun; 4 × 25 mm (0.98 in) machine guns

SMS Donau was a screw corvette of the Austro-Hungarian Navy built in the late 1880s and early 1890s. The only member of her class, she was the final screw corvette built for the Austro-Hungarian fleet.

== Design ==
Donau was 70 m (229 ft 8 in) long at the waterline. She had a beam of 12.84 m (42 ft 2 in) and a draft of 5.56 m (18 ft 3 in). The ship had a displacement of 2,306 long tons (2,343 t). Her crew numbered 333 officers and enlisted sailors.

The ship was powered by a single 2-cylinder, vertical marine steam engine that drove a screw propeller. The number and type of boilers is not known, but smoke from the boilers was vented through a single funnel located amidships, between the fore- and main mast. The ship was fitted with a three-masted sailing rig to supplement the steam engine on long voyages.

Donau was armed with a main battery of ten 12 cm (4.7 in) 35-caliber guns. She also carried two 7 cm (2.8 in), 15-caliber guns and four 25 mm (0.98 in) machine guns.

== Service history ==
Donau was built at the Pola Navy Yard, with her keel laid in October 1888. The ship was ostensibly a reconstruction of the earlier corvette Donau, but this was a legal fiction to conceal the construction of a new warship not authorized by parliament. The older ship was broken up, and only some components were reused in the new ship. She was launched on 18 June 1893, and she was completed in August 1894. In 1896, Donau embarked Archduke Franz Ferdinand for a convalescent cruise to Egypt; at the time, the ship's captain was Leodegar Kneissler, who would go on to serve as the deputy commander of the Austro-Hungarian Navy under Rudolf Montecuccoli.

In 1900, Donau embarked on a circumnavigation of the globe with the graduating class of naval cadets from the naval academy. For the first half of the cruise, she was commanded by Captain Anton Haus. After arriving in Chinese waters in the spring of 1901, Haus transferred to the armored cruiser Kaiserin und Königin Maria Theresia and Donau continued on. She arrived home later that year, having completed the seventh circumnavigation of a ship of the Austro-Hungarian Navy. It was also the last time an Austro-Hungarian fully rigged ship made an overseas cruise.

Donau was decommissioned in 1902. She was disarmed in 1906 and converted into a barracks ship and a stationary training ship for naval cadets, based at the Sebenico Naval School in Sebenico. She remained in the fleet's inventory through World War I, and was ceded to the new Royal Yugoslav Navy in 1920, where she was renamed Sibenik.
