= Hadži Lojo =

Ottoman-Bosnian local leader (1834–1887)

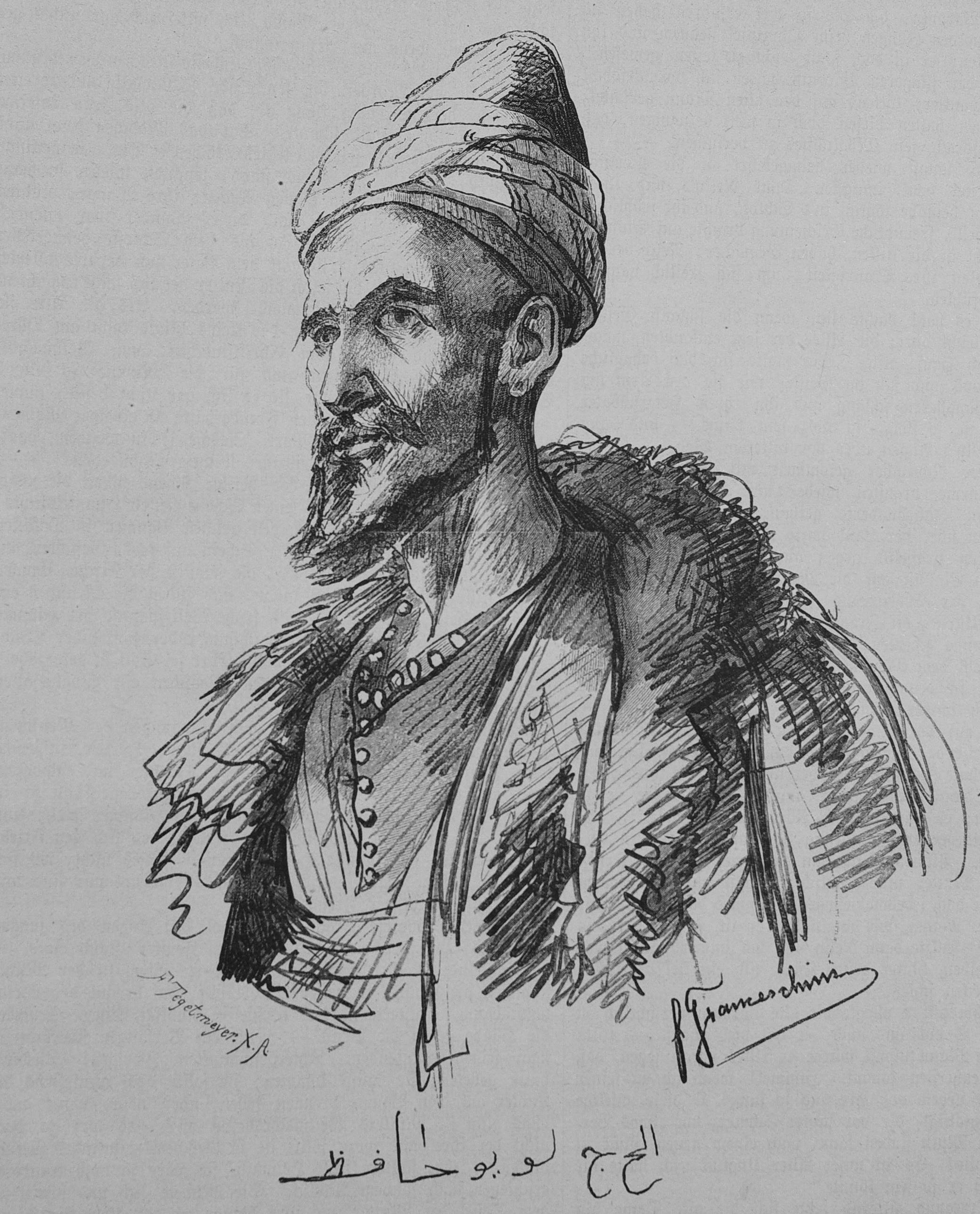
Hadži Lojo, illustrated by F. Franceschini (1878).

Hadži Lojo as a dervish during incarceration in 1880, lithography of photograph.

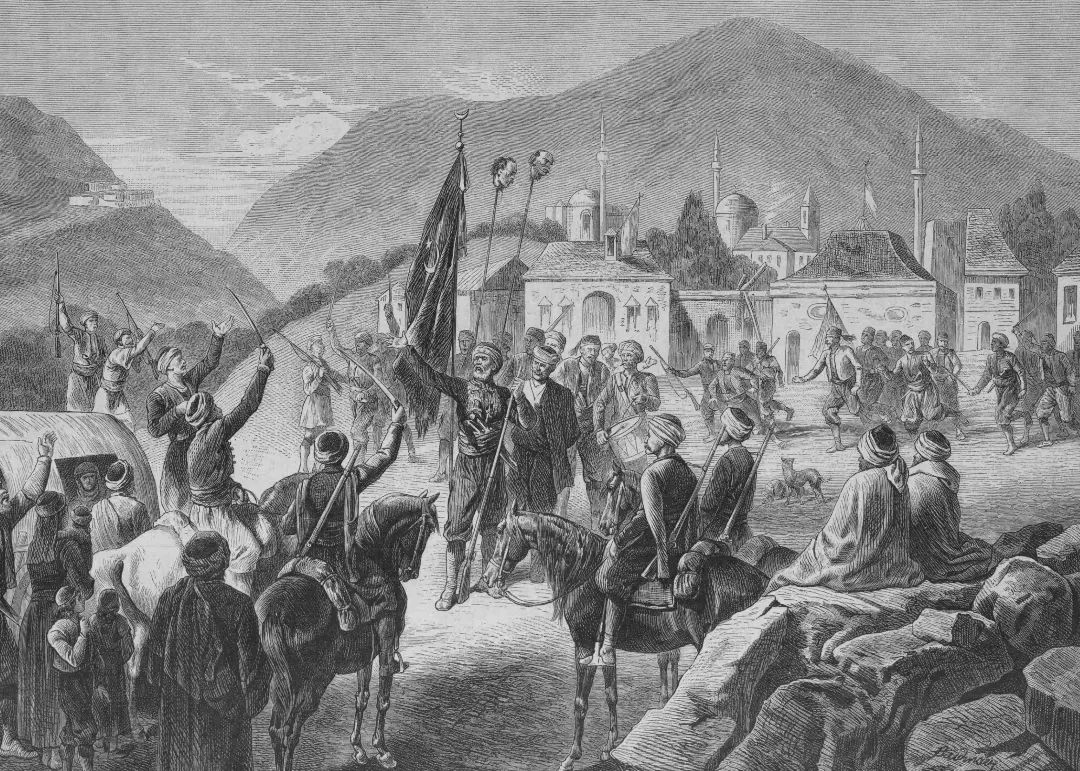
Hadži Lojo preaches insurrection in the front of the gates of Sarajevo

Salih Vilajetović, known as Hadži Lojo (German: Hadschi Lojo; 1834–1887) was a Bosnian leader in Sarajevo in the 1870s.

== Biography ==
A quarry worker, transporter for hire, primary madrasa teacher, and bashi-bazouk, Lojo became noted in the city after joining the resistance to Ottoman reforms, and especially when he in 1872 led the opposition to the building of a new Orthodox church. In the following years he deviated from the Ottoman government and carried out various violent outbursts and robberies (brigandage), which led to the Ottoman authorities chasing him and his band.

Shortly before the occupation of Bosnia and Herzegovina by Austria-Hungary, Lojo rallied the Muslim, Orthodox, Jewish and even some Catholic citizens to fight. Lojo was one of the main leaders of Bosnian resistance to the occupation in the city in 1878, along with people such as Mehmed Šemsikadić, Hafiz Kaukčija and Hadži Jamaković. On 28 July, the opponents of the occupation organized a government in the city and decreed the mobilisation of all Bosnian and other citizens capable of military service. Although he did not actively participate in the rebellion in the city, the Austro-Hungarian government held him accounted as the main organizer, while the other rebel leaders saw him as bothering and of little help, trying to assassinate him on 14 August 1879. On the night of 16–17 August, after wounding himself, he left Sarajevo and hid around Rogatica and Goražde, where he was apprehended on 2 September.

He was at first sentenced to death, then had his sentence reduced to five years in prison, which he then served in Terezín in Bohemia. As he was not allowed to return to Bosnia, Lojo went to Turkey after serving his sentence. He died in Mecca.

There are several novels based on him. Jindřich Penn wrote a (958 pp. long) novel in 1879, Branislav Nušić in 1908, and Rešad Kadić in 1982.

== Sources ==
- Schindler, John. "Defeating Balkan Insurgency: The Austro-Hungarian Army in Bosnia-Hercegovina, 1878-82." Journal of Strategic Studies 27.3 (2004): 528–552.
- Bojic, Mehmedalija. "Armed Resistance in Bosnia and Herzegovina against the Austro-Hungarian Invasion in 1878." Survey Sarajevo 6 (1979): 49.
- "Jedan znameniti Sarajlija: Hadži Hafiz Lojo: Vodja Sarajevskog ustanka protiv okupacije Bosne 1878. Život i djelovanje Hadži Hafiza Saliha Vilaetovića-Loje". Muslimanska Svijest (1): 4–. 1936.
