= SMS Donau (1874) =

- Donau in Algiers in 1886

Class overview
- Operators: Austro-Hungarian Navy
- Preceded by: Aurora class
- Succeeded by: SMS Saida

History
- Name: Donau
- Builder: Navale Adriatico, Trieste
- Laid down: 18 June 1873
- Launched: 15 October 1874
- Completed: 14 August 1875
- Fate: Scrapped, 1888

General characteristics
- Type: Screw corvette
- Displacement: Normal: 2,490 long tons (2,530 t); Full load: 2,642 long tons (2,684 t)
- Length: 74.36 m (244 ft 0 in)
- Beam: 12.66 m (41 ft 6 in)
- Draft: 5.95 m (19 ft 6 in)
- Installed power: 1,300 ihp (970 kW)
- Propulsion: 1 × marine steam engine; 1 × screw propeller
- Speed: 10.8 knots (20.0 km/h; 12.4 mph)
- Complement: 334
- Armament: 11 × 15 cm (5.9 in) Krupp guns; 2 × 7 cm (2.8 in) guns; 4 × 25 mm (0.98 in) machine guns

SMS Donau was a screw corvette of the Austro-Hungarian Navy built in the 1870s. She was the only member of her class.

== Design ==
Donau was 70.96 m (232 ft 10 in) long between perpendiculars and 74.36 m (244 ft 0 in) long overall. She had a beam of 12.66 m (41 ft 6 in) and a draft of 5.95 m (19 ft 6 in). The ship had a displacement of 2,490 long tons (2,530 t) normally, which increased to 2,642 long tons (2,684 t) at full load. Her crew numbered 334 officers and enlisted sailors.

The ship was powered by a single 2-cylinder, vertical marine steam engine that drove a screw propeller. The number and type of boilers is not known, but smoke from the boilers was vented through a single funnel located amidships, between the fore- and main mast. The propulsion system was capable of generating 1,300 indicated horsepower (970 kW), for a top speed of 10.8 knots (20.0 km/h; 12.4 mph). The ship was fitted with a three-masted sailing rig to supplement the steam engine on long voyages.

Donau was armed with a main battery of eleven 15 cm (5.9 in) 35-caliber guns manufactured by Krupp. She also carried two 7 cm (2.8 in), 15-caliber guns and two 25 mm (0.98 in) machine guns.

== Service history ==
The keel for Donau was laid down at the Navale Adriatico shipyard in Trieste on 18 June 1873, and she was launched on 15 October 1874. The ship was completed on 14 August 1875.

In 1885, Donau embarked on an overseas cruise, which took the ship to visit New York City, United States, and several ports in the West Indies.

Worn out by 1888, Donau was officially "reconstructed", but in fact the ship was broken up and only some components, including her engine, was reused in the new ship, also named Donau.
