= Austro-Hungarian campaign in Bosnia and Herzegovina in 1878 =

1878 conquest of Ottoman-controlled Bosnia and Herzegovina by Austria-Hungary

Austro-Hungarian invasion of Bosnia and Herzegovina
- Part of the Great Eastern Crisis
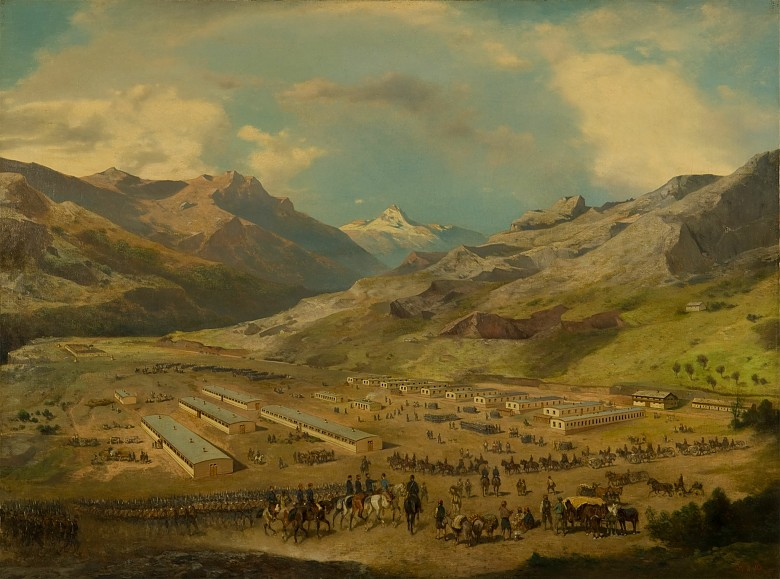
- Northern Austro-Hungarian camp near Mostar, painted by Alexander Ritter von Bensa and Adolf Obermüller
Date	29 July – 20 October 1878 (2 months and 3 weeks)
Location	Bosnia and Herzegovina
Result	Austro-Hungarian victory
Territorial changes	Austro-Hungarian occupation of Bosnia and Herzegovina

Belligerents
Austria-Hungary	Ottoman Empire; Bosnia Vilayet

Commanders and leaders
(Austria-Hungary) Josip Filipović; (Austria-Hungary) Leonidas von Popp; (Austria-Hungary) Gavrilo Rodić; (Austria-Hungary) Stjepan Jovanović	Muhamed Hadžijamaković (executed); Abdulah Kaukčija; Hadži Lojo (surrendered)

Strength
(Austria-Hungary) 198,930 (total) (Austria-Hungary) 91,260 (average)	79,000 insurgents 13,800 soldiers

Casualties and losses
1,205 killed 2,099 died of disease 3,966 wounded 177 missing Total: 7,447	2,000+ killed

The campaign to establish Austro-Hungarian rule in Bosnia and Herzegovina lasted from 29 July to 20 October 1878 against the local resistance fighters, Muslims and Orthodox Serbs, supported unofficially by troops of the Ottoman Empire. The Austro-Hungarian Army entered the province in two large movements: one from the north into Bosnia, and another from the south into Herzegovina. A series of battles in August culminated in the fall of Sarajevo on the 19 August after a day of street-to-street fighting. In the hilly countryside a guerrilla campaign continued until the last rebel stronghold fell after their leader was captured.

== Background ==
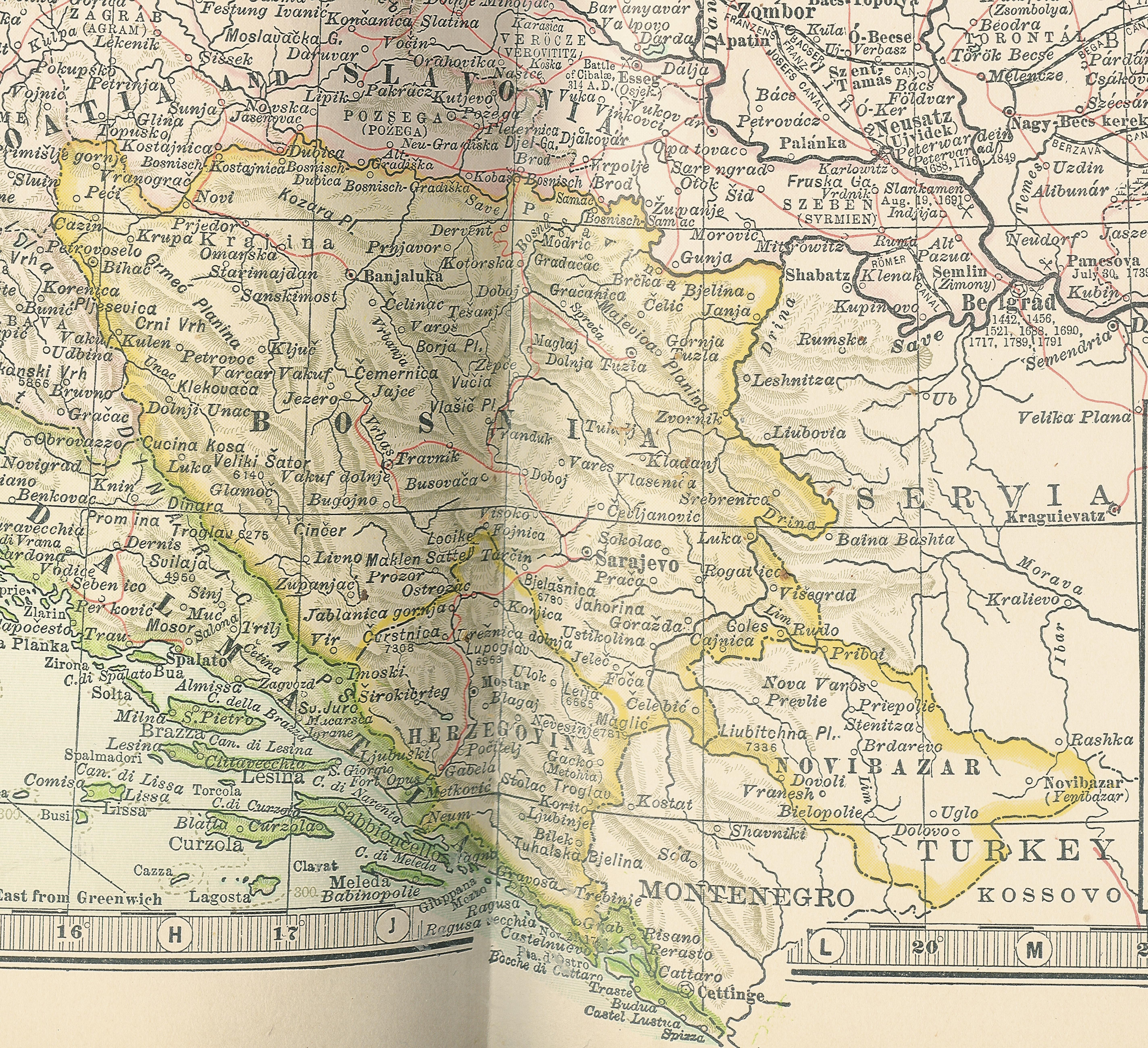
Bosnia, Herzegovina and Novi Pazar on a map from 1904

Following the Russo-Turkish War (1877–1878), the Congress of Berlin was organized by the new German Empire for the Great Powers, on demand of the British Empire. By article 25 of the resulting Treaty of Berlin (13 July 1878), Bosnia and Herzegovina remained under the sovereignty of the Ottoman Empire, but the Austro-Hungarian Empire was granted the provisional authority to occupy the vilayet (province) of Bosnia and Herzegovina, taking on its military defence and civil administration. The Austro-Hungarians also received the right to occupy strategic posts in the sanjak of Novi Pazar:

The provinces of Bosnia and Herzegovina shall be occupied and administered by Austria-Hungary. The government of Austria-Hungary, not desiring to undertake the administration of the Sanjak of Novi-Pazar, which extends between Serbia and Montenegro in a South-Easterly direction to the other side of Mitrovitza, the Ottoman administration will continue to exercise its functions there. Nevertheless, in order to assure the maintenance of the new political state of affairs, as well as freedom and security of communications, Austria-Hungary reserves the right of keeping garrisons and having military and commercial roads in the whole of this part of the ancient vilayet of Bosnia. To this end the governments of Austria-Hungary and the Ottoman Empire reserve to themselves to come to an understanding on the details.

Although the Ottomans protested both occupations, also that of Novi Pazar, the Imperial and Royal (K.u.K.) Foreign Minister Gyula Andrássy secretly assured on the last day of the congress that the occupation was "to be regarded as provisional". This Austro-Hungarian expansion southward at the expense of the Ottoman Empire was designed to prevent the extension of Russian influence and the union of Serbia and Montenegro. This, however, did cause concern for the Ottoman Sultan, Abdul Hamid II, due to the expected discrimination of the Muslim minority.

The Austro-Hungarians expected no trouble in carrying out their occupation. It would be, in Andrássy's words, "a walk with a brass band" (Spaziergang mit einer Blasmusikkapelle). This opinion did not take into account that the Serbs had just fought a war for independence from the Ottoman Empire, while Herzegovina had revolted. Resistance to the Austro-Hungarian takeover came mainly from the Orthodox Serbs (43% of the population) and the Bosnian Muslims (39%), barely at all from the Catholic Croats (18%). The Bosnian Muslim population stood to lose the most under the new Christian government. The resistors were characterised contemptuously by the Austro-Hungarian government as "uncivilised" (unzivilisiert) and "treacherous" (verräterisch).

== Troops ==
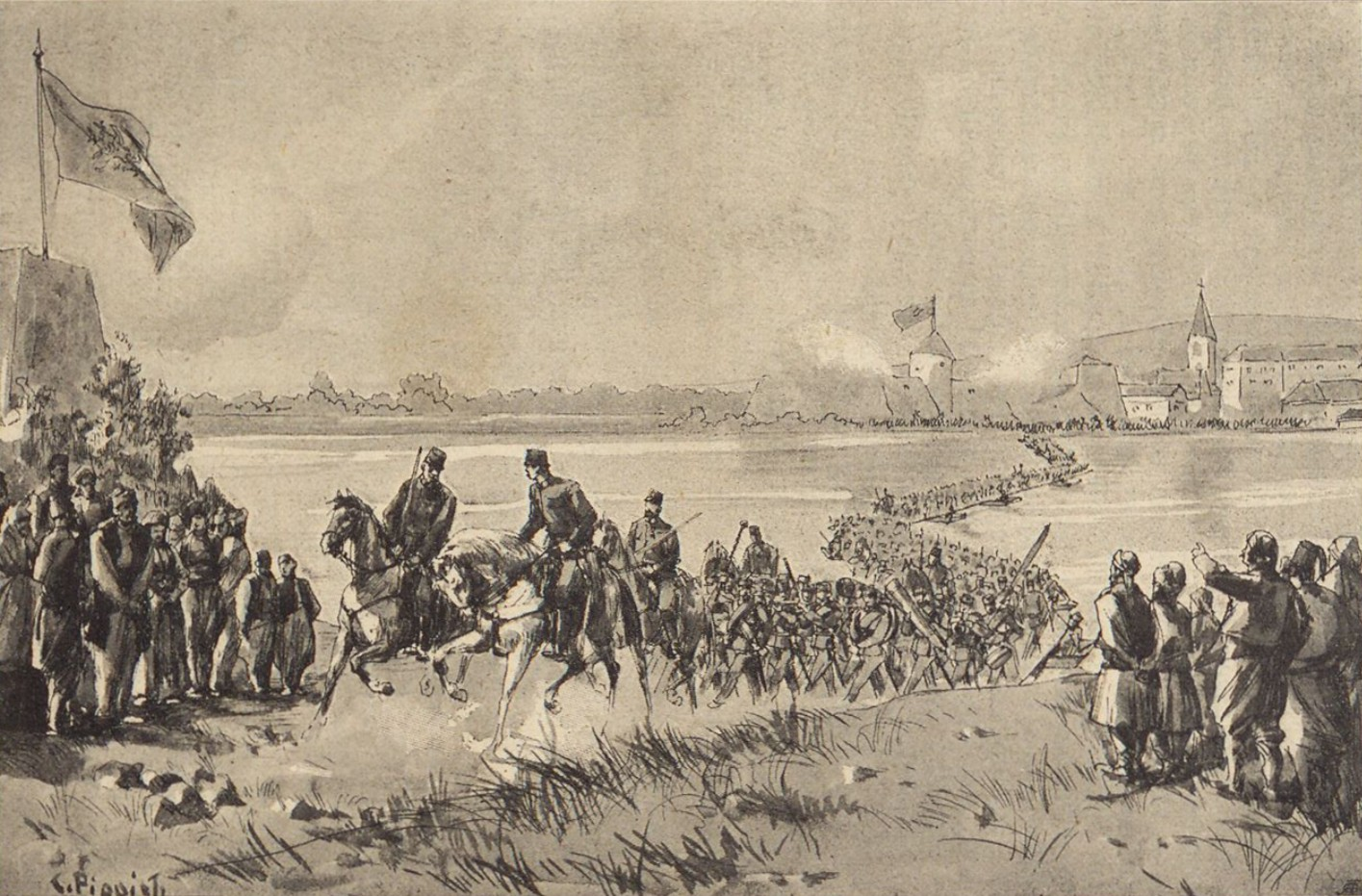
Infantry Regiment No. 17 crossing the Sava by Karl Pippich (1905)

The Austro-Hungarian Army engaged in a major mobilization effort to prepare for the assault on Bosnia and Herzegovina, commanding by the end of June 1878 a force of 82,113 troops, 13,313 horses and 112 cannons in the VI, VII, XX, XVII and XVIII infantry divisions as well as a rear army in the Kingdom of Dalmatia. The primary commander was Josip Filipović, while the head of the operational bureau was Leonidas von Popp; the forward XVIII infantry division was under the command Stjepan Jovanović, while the rear army commander in Dalmatia was Gavrilo Rodić. The occupation of Bosnia and Herzegovina started on 29 July 1878 and was over on 20 October.

The Ottoman army in Bosnia and Herzegovina at the time consisted of roughly 40,000 troops with 77 cannons, that combined with local militias to around 93,000 men. Fierce resistance from Muslims was expected as Austro-Hungarians realized their occupation meant that Bosnian Muslims would lose their privileged status based on their religion.

== Occupation ==
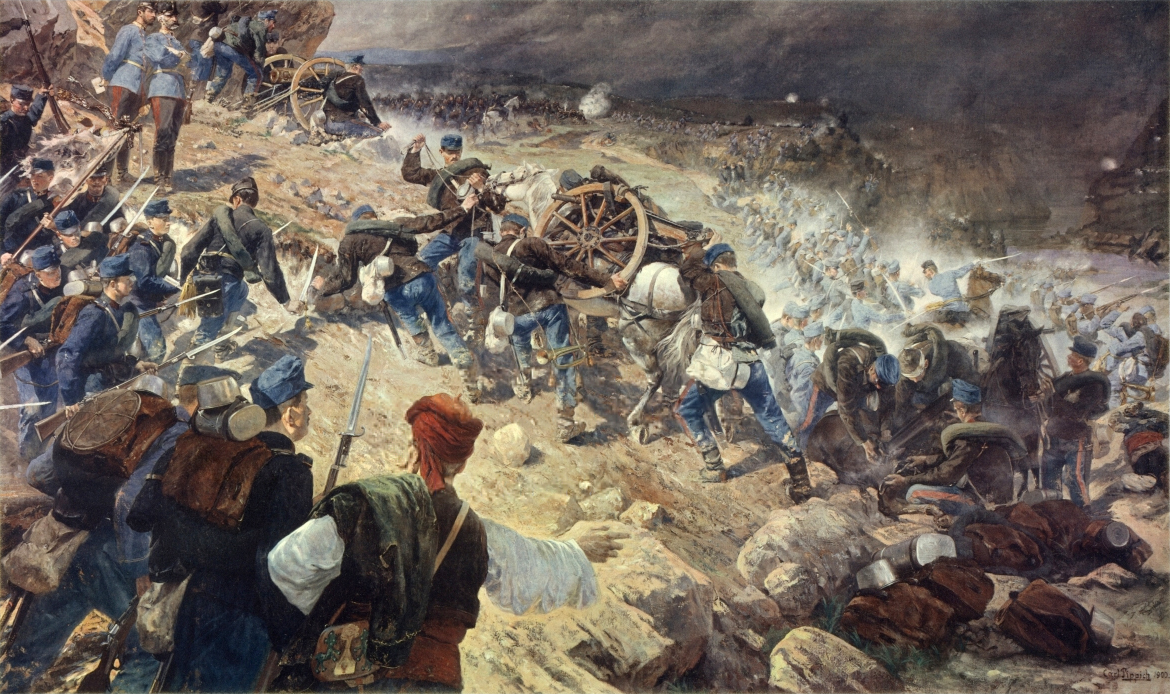
Battle of Jajce, painting by Karl Pippich

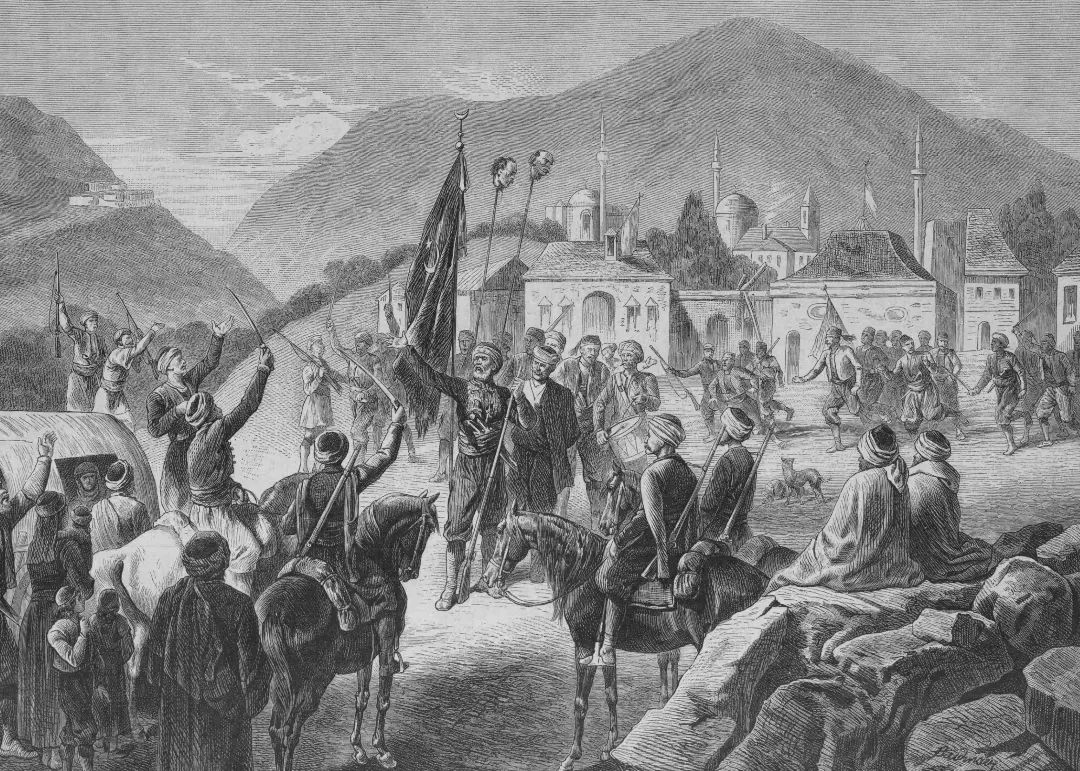
Illustration of Hadži Lojo preaching insurrection before the gates of Sarajevo

The original occupying force, the 13th Corps under General Josip Filipović, crossed the river Sava near Brod, Kostajnica and Gradiška. The various Abteilungen assembled at Banja Luka and advanced down the road on the left side of the Vrbas river. They encountered resistance by local Muslims under the dervish Hadži Lojo, supported (almost openly) by the evacuating Ottoman Army troops. On 3 August a troop of hussars was ambushed near Maglaj on the Bosna river, prompting Filipović to institute martial law. On 7 August a pitched battle was fought near Jajce and the Austro-Hungarian infantry lost 600 men. Most of the men that fought in the battle were from the Carniolan XVII infantry division.

A second occupying force, the 18th Division of 9,000 men under General Stjepan Jovanović, advanced out of Austrian Dalmatia along the Neretva. On 5 August the division captured Mostar, the chief city of Herzegovina. On 13 August at Ravnice in Herzegovina more than 70 Hungarian officers and soldiers were killed in action. In response, the Empire mobilised the 3rd, 4th and 5th Corps.

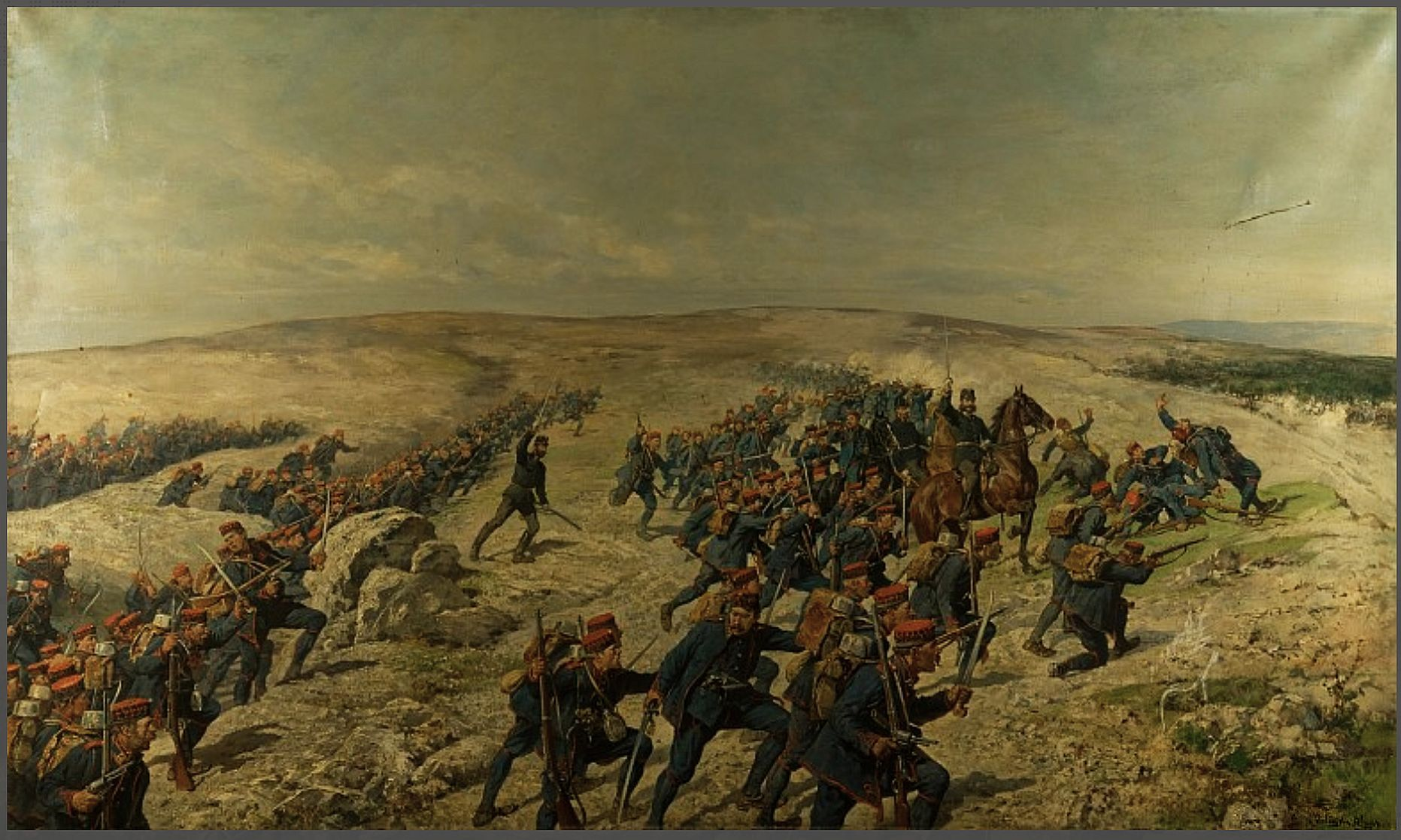
Dalmatian soldiers during the battle of Livno (15 August 1878) by Julius von Blaas.

The Austro-Hungarian troops were occasionally met with ferocious opposition from elements of both Muslim and Orthodox populations there, and significant battles occurred near Čitluk, Stolac, Livno and Klobuk. Despite setbacks at Maglaj and Tuzla, Sarajevo was occupied in October 1878.

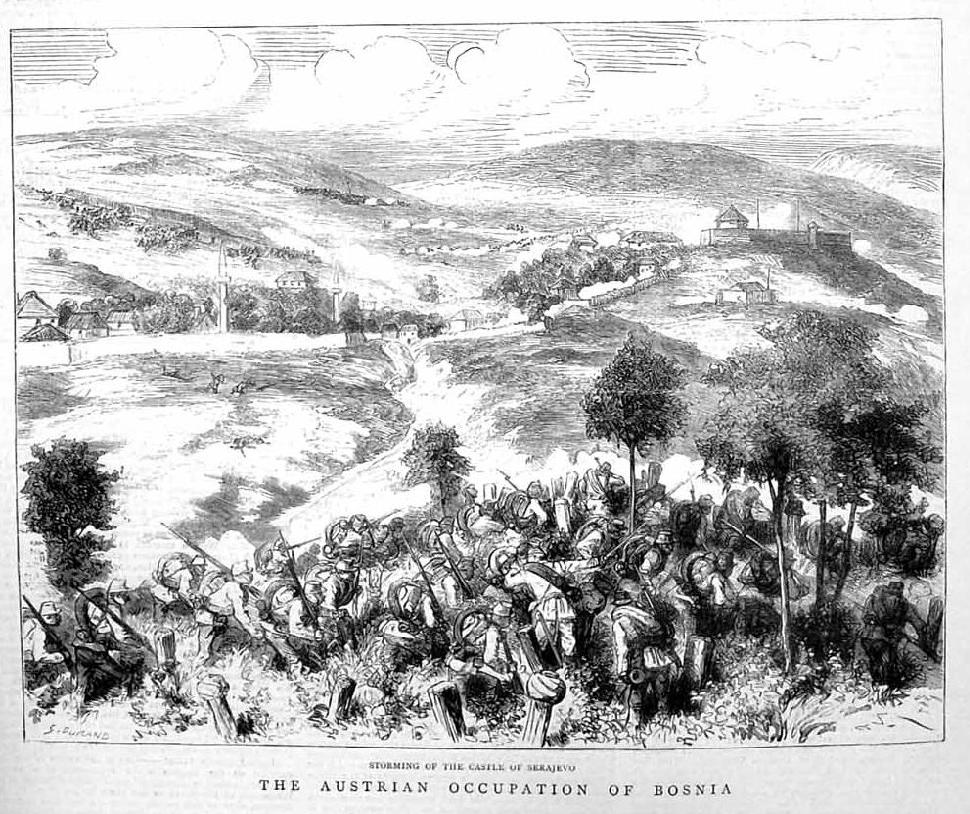
"Storming of the Castle of Sarajevo", from The Graphic (1878)

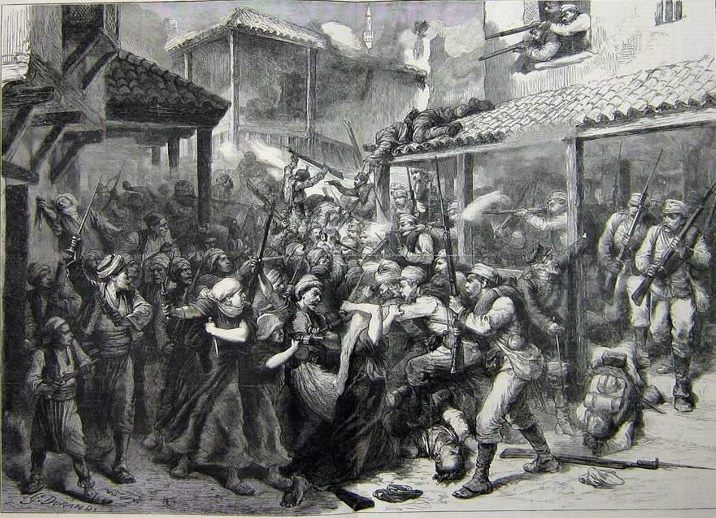
Battle for Sarajevo, by G. Durand, from The Graphic (1878)

On 19 August the Bosnian capital, Sarajevo, a town of 50,000 inhabitants at the time, was captured only after the deployment of 52 guns and violent street fighting. A day earlier Filipović had arrested the former Ottoman governor, Hafiz Pasha. A formal report of the Austro-Hungarian General Staff remarked "small windows and numerous roof gaps allowed the discharge of fire in different directions and the most sustainable defense" and "the accused insurgents, in the nearest houses, barricaded all entrances and kept up a destructive fire against the infantry." (Note: Der ganze äußere Umkreis Sarajevos war stark besetzt. Aber auch im Inneren der Stadt gestatteten die engen Gassen mit ihren vielen Häusergruppen und einzelnen in den Erdgeschossen leicht zu verrammelnden Gebäuden, deren kleine Fenster der Stockwerke und zahlreiche Dachlücken die Abgabe des Feuers nach verschiedenen Richtungen zuließen, die nachhaltigste Verteidigung. Von der Umfassung der Stadt vertrieben, warfen sich die Insurgenten meist in die nächsten Häuser, verbarrikadierten alle Eingänge und unterhielten ein vernichtendes Feuer gegen die nachstürmende Infanterie.) According to Filipović's own account:

There ensued one of the most terrible battles conceivable. The troops were fired upon from every house, from every window, from each split door; and even women took part. Located at the western entrance to the city, the military hospital was full of sick and wounded insurgents. . . (Note: Es entspann sich einer der denkbar gräßlichsten Kämpfe. Aus jedem Hause, aus jedem Fenster, aus jeder Tür spalte wurden die Truppen beschossen; ja selbst Weiber beteiligten sich daran. Das fast ganz am westlichen Stadteingange gelegene Militärspital, voll von kranken und verwundeten Insurgenten. . .)

The occupiers lost 57 killed and 314 wounded of the 13,000 soldiers employed in the operation. They estimated the insurgent fatalities at 300, but made no effort to estimate civilian casualties. In the days following there were many executions of accused rebels following summary trials.

After the fall of Sarajevo the main insurgents retreated into the mountainous country beyond the city and there maintained their resistance for several weeks. Hadži Lojo surrendered to the K.u.K. Hungarian Infantry Regiment No. 37 Erzherzog Joseph on 3 October in the ravine by Rakitnica. He was sentenced to death, but his sentence was later commuted to five years' imprisonment. The castle of Velika Kladuša surrendered on 20 October.

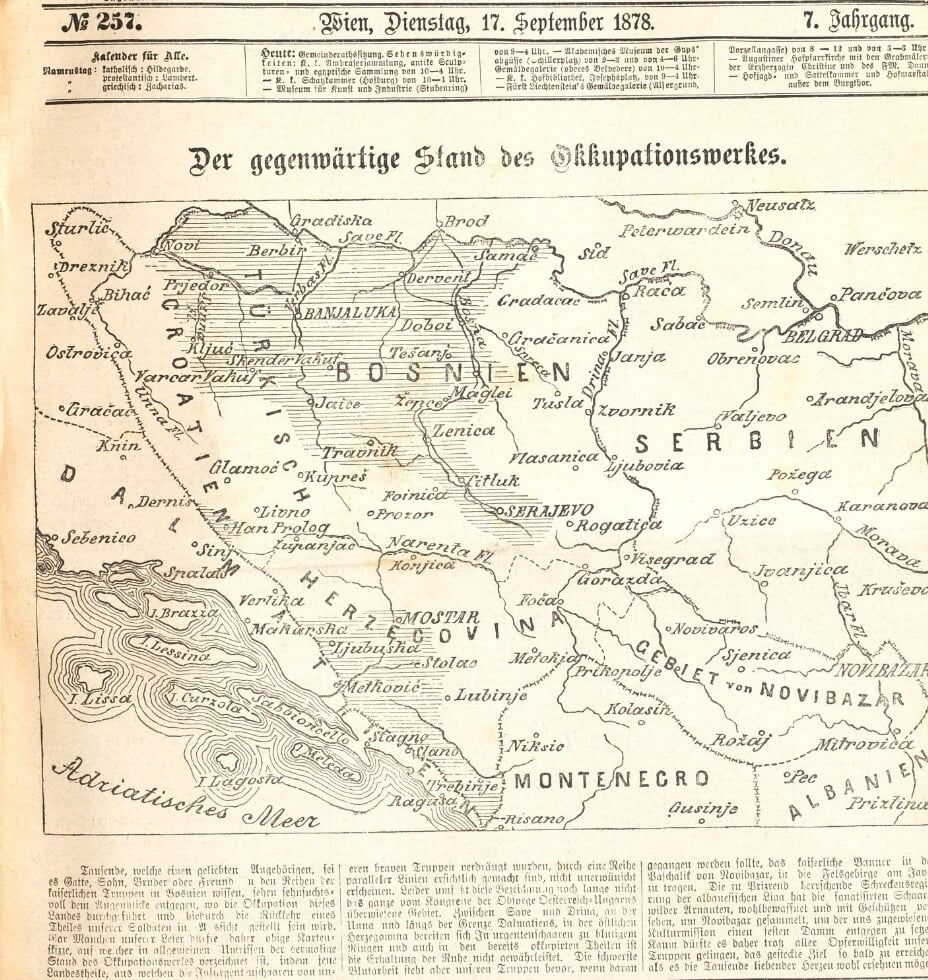
Austrian-occupied territories by September 1878

The Austro-Hungarian Empire was forced to use five corps with a collective strength of 153,300 soldiers and 112 guns to subdue Bosnia and Herzegovina. The General Staff estimated there were 79,000 armed insurgents assisted (illegally) by 13,800 regular Ottoman soldiers with about 77 guns. Total Austro-Hungarian losses were almost 5,200: 946 dead, 272 missing, and 3,980 wounded. The unexpected violence of the campaign led to recriminations between commanders and political leaders. There is no reliable estimate of Bosnian or Ottoman losses. During the campaign, an article in the German-language Hungarian newspaper Pester Lloyd criticising the army's preparedness for the occupation was censored on the orders of Emperor-King Franz Joseph.

== Aftermath ==
Following the occupation of Bosnia and Herzegovina, Austria-Hungary also occupied the Sanjak of Novi Pazar on September 10, 1879, implementing another one of the conclusions of the Congress of Berlin.

Tensions remained in certain parts of the country (particularly Herzegovina) and a mass emigration of predominantly Muslim dissidents occurred. However, a state of relative stability was reached soon enough and Austro-Hungarian authorities were able to embark on a number of social and administrative reforms which intended to make Bosnia and Herzegovina into a "model colony". With the aim of establishing the province as a stable political model that would help dissipate rising South Slav nationalism, Habsburg rule did much to codify laws, to introduce new political practices, and generally to provide for modernization.

== Legacy ==
There is an exhibition in the Museum of Military History in Vienna about the 1878 campaign. It contains several items from the personal property of General Filipović, an insurgent banner and captured Ottoman weapons.
