= List of Croatian soldiers =

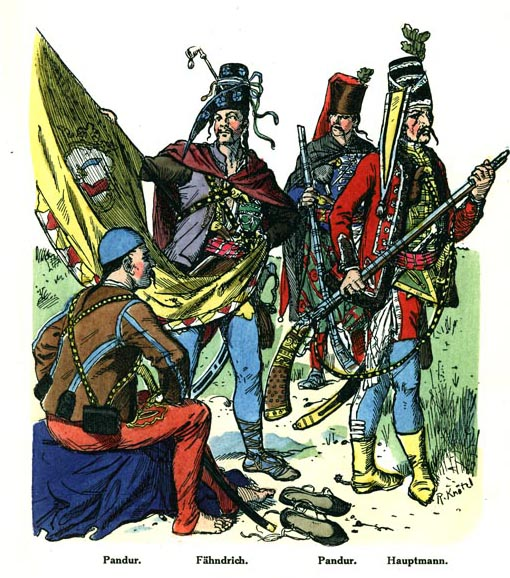
Croatian pandurs from 1742.

This is a list of Croatian soldiers, and it includes military personnel of Croatian origin ranging from early mediaeval times to contemporary Croatian armies.

== Medieval Croatian state ==
=== Croatian principalities (until 925) ===
==== Dalmatian Croatia ====
Soldier	Allegiance	Rank	Wars	Battles	Notes	Image
Višeslav	Dalmatian Croatia	Prince	Frankish campaign against Avars and Slavs	Siege of Trsat	Višeslav waged a war against Franks during his rule and avoided defeat until 803 — a year after his death.	
Borna	Dalmatian Croatia	Prince	Frankish campaign against Ljudevit Posavski	Battle of Kupa		
Trpimir I	Dalmatian Croatia	Prince	Against Byzantine Empire; Croato-Bulgarian Wars			
Domagoj	Dalmatian Croatia	Prince	Civil war in Croatia; Croatian-Venetian Wars; Siege of Bari (866-871)			

==== Pannonian Croatia ====
Soldier	Allegiance	Rank	Wars	Battles	Notes	Image
Vojnomir	Principality of Lower Pannonia / Carolingian Empire	Prince			Vojnomir is known for fighting the Avars during their occupation of Croatia. He launched a joint counterattack with the help of Frankish troops under King Charlemagne in 791. The offensive was successful and the Avars were driven out of Croatia. In return for the help of Charlemagne, Vojnomir was obliged to recognize Frankish sovereignty, convert to Christianity and have his territory named as Principality of Lower Pannonia.	
Ljudevit	Principality of Lower Pannonia	Prince				
Ratimir	Principality of Lower Pannonia / First Bulgarian Empire	Prince				
Braslav	Principality of Lower Pannonia	Prince				

=== Kingdom of Croatia (925–1102) ===
Soldier	Allegiance	Rank	Wars	Battles	Notes	Image
Tomislav	Dalmatian Croatia / Kingdom of Croatia	Prince / King	Croatian–Bulgarian wars	Battle of the Bosnian Highlands	Tomislav united the Croats of Dalmatia and Pannonia into a single Kingdom in 925.	
Michael Krešimir II	Kingdom of Croatia	King	War against Arabs		Michael won a conflict against Arab pirates near the town of Gargano on Italian peninsula in 969.	
Stephen Držislav	Kingdom of Croatia	King	War against Venice			
Svetoslav Suronja	Kingdom of Croatia	King	War against Venice			
Stephen I	Kingdom of Croatia	King	War against Arabs			
Peter Krešimir IV	Kingdom of Croatia	King	War against Normans		Is believed to be taken into captivity during Norman incursion.	
Zvonimir	Kingdom of Croatia	King	War against Holy Roman Empire		He was engaged in a minor conflict with the Holy Roman Emperor Henry IV, specifically one of his vassals in Istria.	
Petar Snačić	Kingdom of Croatia	King	War against Kingdom of Hungary	Battle of Gvozd Mountain		

== Croatia in personal union with Hungary (1102–1527) ==
Soldier	Allegiance	Rank	Wars	Battles	Notes	Image
Paul I Šubić of Bribir (c. 1245 - 1 May 1312)	Kingdom of Croatia / Kingdom of Hungary	Ban of Croatia / Lord of all of Bosnia	Wars against Venice / Wars against Bosnians			
Mladen Šubić	Kingdom of Croatia / Kingdom of Hungary	Ban of Croatia / Lord of all of Bosnia	Šubić-Damlatian cities Wars / Louis The Great Wars of centralization	Battle of Blizna		
John of Palisna	Kingdom of Croatia / Kingdom of Hungary	Ban of Croatia	Croatian–Ottoman Wars / Ottoman wars in Europe	Battle of Kosovo; Anti-Court Movement Wars	John of Palisna led a contingent of Knights Hospitallers from Vrana in Croatia against Ottomans in the Battle of Kosovo.	
Ivan Frankopan Cetinski	Kingdom of Croatia / Kingdom of Hungary	Ban of Croatia	Croatian–Ottoman Wars / Ottoman wars in Europe	Battle of Una; Battle of Vrpile gulch; Battle of Krbava field		
Bernardin Frankopan	Kingdom of Croatia / Kingdom of Hungary	nobleman	Croatian–Ottoman Wars	Battle of Una; Battle of Vrpile gulch; Battle of Krbava field		
Petar Berislavić	Kingdom of Croatia / Kingdom of Hungary	Ban of Croatia	Croatian–Ottoman Wars / Ottoman wars in Europe	Siege of Jajce; Battle of Plješivica		
Ivan Karlović (1478 - 1531)	Kingdom of Croatia / Kingdom of Hungary	Ban of Croatia	Croatian–Ottoman Wars / Ottoman wars in Europe	Siege of Vienna (1529)		

== Croatia within Habsburg Monarchy (1527–1918) ==
=== Regular Habsburg army ===
Soldier	Allegiance	Rank	Wars	Battles	Notes	Image
Christoph Frankopan	Kingdom of Croatia / John Zapolya	Ban of Croatia	Croatian–Ottoman Wars / Habsburg-Zapolya Succession War	Siege of Varaždin (1527)		
Petar Keglević	Kingdom of Croatia a part of Habsburg monarchy	Ban of Croatia		Siege of Vienna (1529); Katzianer's Campaign		
Franjo Vlašić	Kingdom of Croatia a part of Habsburg monarchy	Ban of Croatia				
Nikola Šubić Zrinski	Kingdom of Croatia a part of Habsburg monarchy	Ban of Croatia	Croatian–Ottoman wars / Ottoman wars in Europe	Siege of Szigetvár	Nikola Šubić Zrinski was most known for defending Szigetvar Fortress against Ottomans.	
Tamas (Toma) Erdody	Kingdom of Croatia a part of Habsburg monarchy	Ban of Croatia	Croatian–Ottoman wars / Ottoman wars in Europe	Battle of Slunj; Battle of Brest; Battle of Sisak		
Petar Zrinski	Kingdom of Croatia a part of Habsburg monarchy	Ban of Croatia	Croatian–Ottoman wars / Austro-Turkish War (1663–1664)	Battle at Jurjeve Stijene (1663)		
Nikola VII Zrinski	Kingdom of Croatia a part of Habsburg monarchy	Ban of Croatia	Croatian–Ottoman wars / Austro-Turkish War (1663–1664)	First battle of Novi Zrin; Second battle of Novi Zrin; Third battle of Novi Zrin		
Miklos (Nikola) Erdody	Kingdom of Croatia a part of Habsburg monarchy	Ban of Croatia	Croatian–Ottoman wars / Great Turkish War	Siege of Virovitica (1684)		

==== Officers ====
Soldier	Allegiance	Rank	Wars	Battles	Notes	Image
16-17 Century
Nikola Jurišić	Kingdom of Croatia, a part of Habsburg monarchy	Captain	Ottoman wars in Europe; Little War in Hungary	Siege of Güns (Kőszeg) (1532)	Nikola Jurišić defended the small border fort of Kőszeg with only 700-800 Croatian soldiers with no cannons and few guns, preventing the advance of the Turkish army of 120,000-140,000 toward Vienna.	
Adam Zrinski	Kingdom of Croatia, a part of Habsburg monarchy	officer	Great Turkish War (1683-1699)	Siege of Virovitica (1684); Battle of Slankamen		
Marko Mesić	Kingdom of Croatia, a part of Habsburg monarchy	soldier-priest	Great Turkish War (1683-1699)	Siege of Udbina (1689); Siege of Bihać (1687)		
Ivan Andrija Makar	Kingdom of Croatia, a part of Habsburg monarchy	general	Great Turkish War (1683-1699)	Slavonian campaign; Siege of Bihać (1687)		
Pavao Ritter Vitezović	Kingdom of Croatia, a part of Habsburg monarchy	poet and scholar, was granted a status of knight on diet of Požun	Great Turkish War (1683-1699)	Participated in Croatian/Habsburg army attacks on Szigetvar and Lendava		
18-19 Century
Franjo Jelačić	Habsburg monarchy	Feldmarschall-Leutnant	Austro-Turkish War (1787–1791); French Revolutionary Wars; Napoleonic Wars	Ulm Campaign; Battle of Sankt Michael; Battle of Raab; Battle of Wagram		
Peter Vitus von Quosdanovich	Habsburg monarchy	Feldmarschall-Leutnant	Seven Years' War; War of the Bavarian Succession; Austro-Turkish War (1787–1791); French Revolutionary Wars			
Josef Philipp Vukassovich	Austrian Empire	Feldmarschall-Leutnant	Austro-Turkish War (1787–1791); French Revolutionary Wars; Napoleonic Wars	Siege of Mantua (1796–1797); Battle of Wagram		
Franjo Tomašić	Austrian Empire	Lieutenant field marshal	French revolutionary wars; Napoleonic wars	Siege of Zara (Zadar) 1813		
Josip Jelačić	Austrian Empire; Triune Kingdom of Croatia, Slavonia and Dalmatia	Feldzugmeister	Revolutions of 1848; Hungarian Revolution of 1848	Battle of Pákozd; Vienna Uprising; Battle of Schwechat; Battle of Mór; Battle of Kápolna; Battle of Isaszeg; Battle of Tápióbicske; Battle of Káty		
Grgo Kusić (1892–1918)	Austria-Hungary	Soldier			Grgo Kusić was a 2.37 m (7 ft 9 1/2 in) tall Croat soldier in the Austro-Hungarian Army. According to some accounts, Kusić was the tallest soldier of the Austro-Hungarian Army.	
Stjepan Sarkotić	Austria-Hungary	General	World War I			
Maximilian Njegovan	Austria-Hungary	Admiral	World War I			
Josip Filipović	Austria-Hungary	General	Bosnian Campaign of 1878; World War I			
Svetozar Borojević	Austria-Hungary	Field marshal	Bosnian Campaign of 1878; World War I	Eastern Front; Battles of the Isonzo; Second Battle of the Piave river; Battle of Vitorio Venetto	His wartime merits earned him nickname "Lion of Soča". Although originating from Serbian Orthodox family, at the end of his life, he declared himself as Croatian.	
Anton Lipošćak	Austria-Hungary	General	World War I	Carpathian Front		
Slavko Kvaternik	Austria-Hungary; State of Croats, Serbs and Slovenes; Independent State of Croatia	Marshal	World War I; World War II	1918 occupation of Međimurje		

=== Irregular military ===
==== Uskoci ====
Soldier	Allegiance	Rank	Wars	Battles	Notes	Image
Petar Kružić	Kingdom of Croatia a part of Habsburg monarchy	Captain	Ottoman wars in Europe		Petar Kružić was a capitan of Klis and Senj. He gathered together a garrison composed of Croat refugees, who used the base at Klis Fortress both to hold the Turks at bay, and to engage in marauding and piracy against coastal shipping. Although nominally accepting the sovereignty of the Habsburg Emperor Ferdinand I, who obtained the Croatian crown in 1527, Kružić and his freebooting Uskoci were a law unto themselves.	
Ivan Lenković (died 1569. Metlika, Slovenia)	Kingdom of Croatia a part of Habsburg monarchy	General	Ottoman wars in Europe		Ivan Lenković was ruler of Senj and Military Frontier commander. He is noted for the construction of Fortress Nehaj and as a captain of the Uskoks.	
Ivo Senjanin	Kingdom of Croatia a part of Habsburg monarchy		Ottoman wars in Europe			
Elia Peraizza	Kingdom of Croatia a part of Habsburg monarchy		Ottoman wars in Europe			

==== Hajduci ====
- Andrijica Šimić – legendary hajduk
- Mijat Tomić – Croatian legendary Hajduk
- Luka Ibrišimović – Priest, Spy and Hajduk

==== Pandurs ====
- Baron Franjo Trenk – leader of Pandurs; father of military music

==== Rebel peasants ====
Soldier	Allegiance	Rank	Wars	Battles	Notes	Image
Ambroz "Matija" Gubec	Muška punta	Peasant army leader	Croatian-Slovene peasant revolt	Battle of Donja Stubica		
Ilija "Prebeg" Gregorić	Kingdom of Croatia a part of Habsburg monarchy; Muška punta	Grenzer; Peasant army commander	Hundred Years Ottoman-Croatian War; Henning-Tahy Wars; Croatian-Slovene peasant revolt	Battle of Susedgrad (1565); Battle of Krško		

== World War II (1941–1945) ==
=== Ustaše ===
- Andrija Artuković
- Jure Francetić
- Mile Budak
- Rafael Boban
- Miroslav Filipović
- Dido Kvaternik
- Slavko Kvaternik
- Josip Metzger
- Mladen Lorković
- Ljubo Miloš
- Tias Mortigjija
- Dinko Šakić
- Cvitan Galić
- Marko Mesić
- Vladimir Metikoš

=== Croatian and Yugoslav Partisans ===
Soldier	Allegiance	Rank	Wars	Battles	Notes	Image
Josip Broz Tito	Austria-Hungary; Yugoslavia	Marshal	World War I; Russian Civil War; World War II			
Ivan Gošnjak	Spanish Republic; Yugoslavia	General	Spanish Civil War; World War II			
Ivan Rukavina	Spanish Republic; Yugoslavia	General	Spanish Civil War; World War II			
Franjo Tuđman	Yugoslavia; Croatia	Vrhovnik	World War II; Croatian War of Independence			
Joža Horvat	Yugoslavia	Officer	World War II			
Ivan Šibl	Yugoslavia	General	World War II			
Vladimir Bakarić	Yugoslavia	Officer	World War II			
Rade Bulat	Yugoslavia	Officer	World War II			
Stjepan Filipović	Yugoslavia		World War II			
Franjo Kluz	Yugoslavia		World War II			
Josip Kraš	Yugoslavia		World War II			
Josip Manolić	Yugoslavia; Croatia	Officer	World War II; Croatian War of Independence			
Josip Boljkovac	Yugoslavia; Croatia		World War II			
Martin Špegelj	Yugoslavia; Croatia	Officer	World War II			
Andrija Hebrang (father)	Yugoslavia	Officer	World War II			

== Republic of Croatia (1991–present) ==
=== Croatian War of Independence ===
The following is a list of distinguished Croatian soldiers from Croatian War of Independence listen in alphabetical order.

Soldier	Allegiance	Rank	Wars	Battles	Notes	Image
Rahim Ademi	Socialist Federal Republic of Yugoslavia Croatia	general	Croatian War of Independence	Battle of Šibenik; Operation Medak Pocket; Battle of Derale Pass		
Andrija Andabak	Croatia	colonel (posthumously)	Croatian War of Independence		Credited for destroying 32 enemy AFV's, out of which 30 tanks. Croatian Army awards a medal named after him to those soldiers who destroy three or more AFV's.	
Branimir Anić - Matan	Croatia	officer	Croatian War of Independence			
Marko Babić	Croatia	officer	Croatian War of Independence	Battle of Vukovar		
Zoran Babić	Croatia	officer	Croatian War of Independence			
Tihomir Blaškić	Croatia; Herzeg-Bosnia	general	Croatian War of Independence; Bosnian War			
Janko Bobetko	Socialist Federal Republic of Yugoslavia Croatia	general	World War II; Croatian War of Independence; Bosnian War	Operation Tiger; Operation Maslenica; Operation Medak Pocket; Operation Winter '94		
Agim Çeku	Croatia	officer	Croatian War of Independence			
Ivan Čermak	Croatia	general	Croatian War of Independence			
Zvonimir Červenko	Socialist Federal Republic of Yugoslavia Croatia	general	Croatian War of Independence	Operation Flash; Operation Storm; Operation Summer '95		
Ljubo Ćesić Rojs	Croatia	general	Croatian War of Independence; Bosnian War			
Davor Domazet-Lošo	Socialist Federal Republic of Yugoslavia Croatia	admiral	Croatian War of Independence	Operation Medak Pocket; Operation Storm		
Željko Glasnović	Canada France Croatia Herzeg-Bosnia	general	Croatian War of Independence; Bosnian War			
Branimir Glavaš	Croatia	officer	Croatian War of Independence			
Ante Gotovina	France Croatia	general	Shaba II; Croatian War of Independence; Bosnian War	Battle of Kowelzi; Operation Maslenica; Operation Storm; Operation Winter '94; Operation Summer '95; Operation Storm; Operation Mistral; Operation Southern Move		
Davor Jović	Croatia	officer	Croatian War of Independence; Bosnian War	Operation Tiger; Operation Maslenica; Operation Storm		
Ivan Korade	Croatia	general	Croatian War of Independence; Bosnian War	Operation Tiger; Operation Maslenica; Operation Storm; Operation Mistral; Operation Southern Move		
Damir Krstičević	Socialist Federal Republic of Yugoslavia Croatia	general	Croatian War of Independence; Bosnian War	Operation Winter '94; Operation Summer '95; Operation Storm; Operation Mistral; Operation Southern Move		
Ante Kotromanović	Croatia	general	Croatian War of Independence; Bosnian War	Operation Summer '95; Operation Storm; Battle of Derale pass; Operation Mistral 2		
Sveto Letica	Croatia	admiral	Croatian War of Independence			
Mladen Markač	Croatia	general	Croatian War of Independence			
Slobodan Praljak	Croatia; Herzeg-Bosnia	general	Croatian War of Independence; Bosnian War	Siege of Mostar		
Petar Stipetić	Socialist Federal Republic of Yugoslavia Croatia	general	Croatian War of Independence	Operation Corridor 92; Operation Flash; Operation Phoenix; Operation Storm		
Anton Tus	Socialist Federal Republic of Yugoslavia Croatia	general	Croatian War of Independence			
Blago Zadro	Croatia	general	Croatian War of Independence	Battle of Vukovar		
Drago Lovrić	Socialist Federal Republic of Yugoslavia Croatia	general	Croatian War of Independence			
Mirko Šundov	Socialist Federal Republic of Yugoslavia Croatia	general	Croatian War of Independence			
Robert Hranj	Croatia	admiral	Croatian War of Independence			

=== Croatia–NATO relations ===
- Gordana Garašić

== Foreign Armies ==
Soldier	Allegiance	Rank	Wars	Battles	Notes	Image
Michael J. Novosel	United States of America	Lieutenant Colonel (USAF); Chief Warrant Officer (USA)	World War II; Korean War; Vietnam War		Michael J. Novosel, Sr. (September 3, 1922 – April 2, 2006) was a recipient of the United States' highest military decoration — the Medal of Honor — and a retired Chief Warrant Officer (CW4).	
Lothar Rendulic	Austria-Hungary; Austria; Nazi Germany	Oberst (Austria); Generaloberst (Germany)	World War II			
Louis Cukela	United States of America	Major	World War I World War II	Soissons engagement Battle of Belleau Wood		
Peter Tomich	United States of America	Chief Watertender (Navy)	World War I World War II	Attack on Pearl Harbor		
Vjekoslav Prebeg	Croatia Ukraine	soldier	War in Donbas; 2022 Russian invasion of Ukraine	Siege of Mariupol		
Matija Zmajević	Tsardom of Russia	Admiral				
Rustem Pasha Opuković	Ottoman Empire	General				
Piyale Pasha	Ottoman Empire	Grand Admiral and Vizier				
Veli Mahmud Pasha	Ottoman Empire	General				
Hersekzade Ahmed Pasha	Ottoman Empire	General				
İshak Pasha	Ottoman Empire	General				
Kuyucu Murat Pasha	Ottoman Empire	General				

== See also ==
- Military history of Croatia
