= Croatian-Slavonian-Dalmatian theater in the Great Turkish War =

Croatian-Slavonian theater in the Great Turkish War
- Part of the Great Turkish War
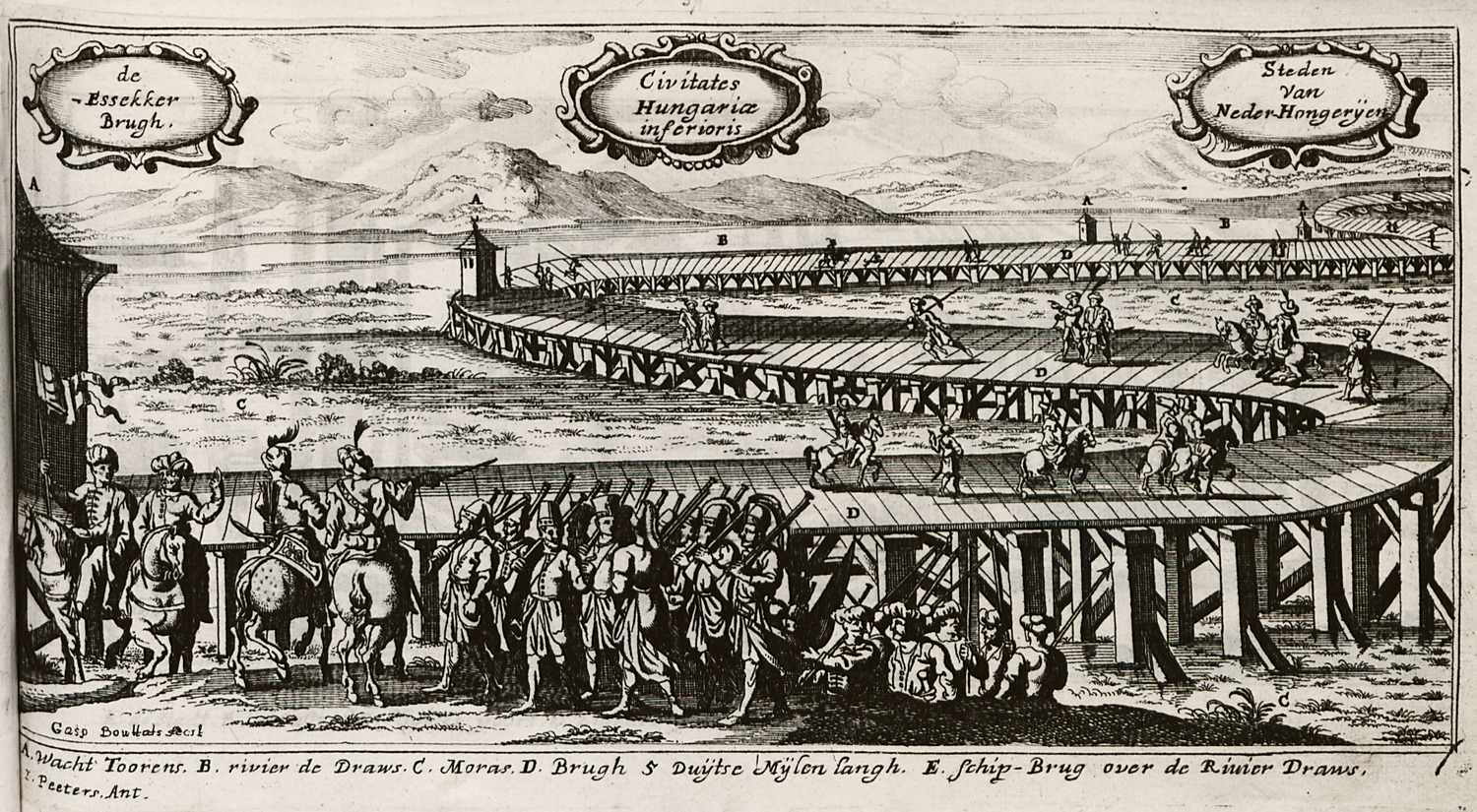
- Osijek bridge in 1686, during the war
Date	1684–1699
Location	Croatia, Slavonia, Dalmatia
Result	Holy League victory
Territorial changes	Liberation of Slavonia and Lika and part of the Pounje from the Ottomans; Ottoman Empire pushed out of Central Europe

Belligerents
Habsburg Monarchy: Kingdom of Croatia; Croatian Military Frontier; Slavonian Military Frontier; Republic of Venice	Ottoman Empire: Kanije Eyalet; Bosnia Eyalet

Commanders and leaders
Leopold I Habsburg; Nikola (Miklos) Erdody; Imperial War Council; James Leslie; Ivan Andrija Makar; Luka Ibrišimović; Marko Mesić; Adam Zrinski †; Pavao Ritter Vitezović; Girolamo Cornaro; Šimun Fanfogna; Johann Joseph Herberstein; Stojan Janković; Eugene of Savoy	Amcazade Köprülü Hüseyin Pasha; Mehmed-paša Atlagić; Mehmed-beg Crnčić; Funduk pasha †; Hasan pasha of Bosnia

The Great Turkish War of 1684–1689 saw conflict between the Holy League and the Ottoman Empire in territories of Croatia, Slavonia and Dalmatia. The war was concluded by the Treaty of Karlowitz in 1699, which significantly eased the Ottoman grip on Croatia.

== Prelude ==
=== Croatian-Ottoman Wars ===
Following the Ottoman conquest of Kingdom of Bosnia in 1463, the territories of Slavonia, Croatia and Dalmatia came under ever increasing Ottoman pressure. Initially, armies led by Croatian nobles resisted frequent akinji and martolos incursions, and even scored some victories such as the Battle of Una and Battle of Vrpile Pass. However, the regular attacks which usually came once a year, eventually proved to be too much for Croatia to handle alone and they culminated in Croatian defeat at Battle of Krbava Field in 1493, where much of Croatian nobility was killed. Lack of funds and poor help from the weak Hungarian kings of Jagellonian dynasty resulted in ever increasing depopulation of Croatian lands, burdened by constant state of warfare. As a result of Ottoman conquests, center of the Croatian medieval state gradually moved northwards into Slavonia (Zagreb). Since Slavonian territory also kept shrinking due to Ottoman conquests, the political breaking point happened on 1 September 1558, when united Croatian-Slavonian parliament was held in Zagreb, which became a permanent political state in the future. Due to migrations of Croatian nobility and common people, "the Croatian name", also moved northwards in what was once medieval Slavonia.

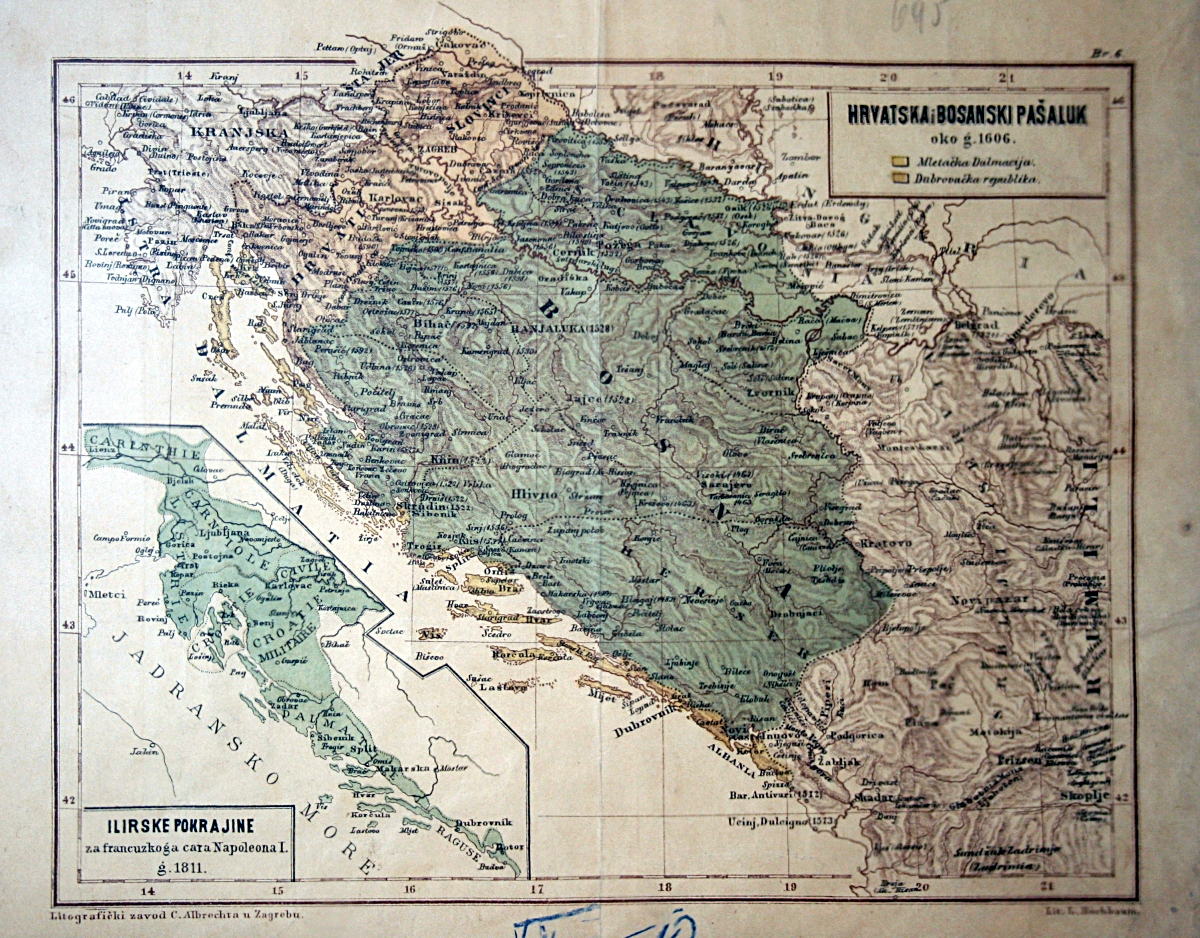
Map of Croatia as it was in 1606, while being reduced to "Remnants of the remnants"

After Hungarian defeat in Battle of Mohacs in 1526 and ensuing succession crisis inside the Hungarian-Croatian kingdom, the Ottomans made use of this dissolution, by further taking large parts of Hungary, Slavonia, Croatia and Dalmatia in first half of the 16th century. The Croatian lands were thus reduced to "remnants of the remnants" - a rather small part of western parts of medieval Slavonia and Croatia. After Croatia joined Habsburg Monarchy on Diet of Cetingrad in 1527, its depopulated territories were further taken out of Croatian jurisdiction by Habsburg decree, through formation of Military Frontier under command of Imperial War Council in Graz. Nonetheless, the Ottoman conquest of Croatian lands was mostly halted by their defeat in Battle of Sisak in 1593.

=== The Siege of Vienna 1683 and Formation of Holy League ===
The Vasvár peace, the twenty year long period of peace established by the Vasvár peace treaty in 1664, was due to expire in twenty years, and weakened Ottoman Empire, decided to renew its hostilities against the Habsburg Monarchy. In the year 1683, a massive army was assembled and sent off across Ottoman Balkan and Hungarian territories in order to attack and besiege Vienna. The siege of Vienna in 1683 ended in disaster for the Ottomans as their besieging army was routed near Vienna by the relief forces of Polish king Jan III Sobieski. Following the Ottoman defeat, an anti-Ottoman alliance sponsored by the Pope, named the "Holy League" was formed. The League comprised the Habsburg Monarchy, Poland and Venice, and its goal was pushing the Ottomans out of Europe.

=== Croatian preparations ===
According to Croatian historian Tadija Smičiklas, by the end of 1682, Croatian nobility was well aware of Ottoman intentions to attack Vienna again. For example, back in March 1682, Croatian friar Luka Ibrišimović sent letters to bishop of Zagreb, informing him of increased Ottoman activities in Slavonia such as: collecting food and augmenting fortifications and bridges. Same year in May, he sent another report of Ottomans making lists of all available soldiers in Slavonia and stockpiling their large cannons in Osijek. With that in mind, between 1682 and 1683 Croats began with their own preparatory measures such as intense communication with emperor Leopold, Styrian and Carniolan nobility, as well as the Pope; who even sent some financial aid. The grand vizier Kara Mustafa apparently also dispatched letters, trying to persuade Croatians to join his army in attack on Vienna, but these were rejected.

While anticipating impending Ottoman strike on Vienna, Croatian army remained deployed on borders of Croatia, Styria and Carniola, should Ottomans decide to swing southwards during their offensive on Habsburg capital. Croatian-Slavonian Parliament assembled in May 1683 in Varaždin in order to discuss the final preparations for impending Ottoman strike.

The news of Ottoman defeat near Vienna in September 1683 were met in Croatia with relief on one hand, but they also ignited a zeal for revenge so local troops went on several raids inside Ottoman controlled lands in order to loot them. Croatian ban Erdody, who stationed in Čakovec on 17 September 1683, commenced several attacks on Ottoman outposts in Kanije Eyalet. Pavao Ritter Vitezović also took parts in attacks on Lendava and Szigetvar.

== The war ==
In year 1684, the Habsburg Imperial Army commenced its operations by making 3 main thrusts into the Ottoman controlled territory. The main corps of the army commanded by Charles of Lorraine pushed towards Hungarian capital of Buda, another corps made its efforts against Ottoman vassal Principality of Upper Hungary, while the third Habsburg thrust followed Drava river and made a push towards Osijek.

=== Operations in Slavonia ===
As Imperial Army attempted to capture Hungarian capital of Buda in 1684, ban of Croatia Erdody, endeavoured to do the same with his army in regard to Ottoman-held parts of Slavonia, as well as Bosnia.

The Drava (Slavonian) campaign began with the Siege of Virovitica in 1684, while some other notable battles included:

- Osijek Campaign (1685)
- Battle of Mohács (1687) - caused Ottoman armies to flee Osijek
- Battle of Požega (1689)
- Battle of Velika Monastery (1690)
- Battle of Osijek (1690)
- Battle of Zenta

=== Operations in Dalmatia ===
Anti-Ottoman operations in Dalmatia began as early as spring of 1684 with Stojan Janković's and Ilija Smiljanić's Uskok irregulars ravaging the countryside of the Ottoman-held provinces in Dalmatia. After the fall of Ottoman outpost of Dvore near Split, the only two remaining Ottoman strongholds in Dalmatia became the towns of Knin and Sinj, both in Dalmatian Hinterland.

- Battle of Sinj (1686)
- Siege of Knin (1688)

=== Operations in Pounje ===
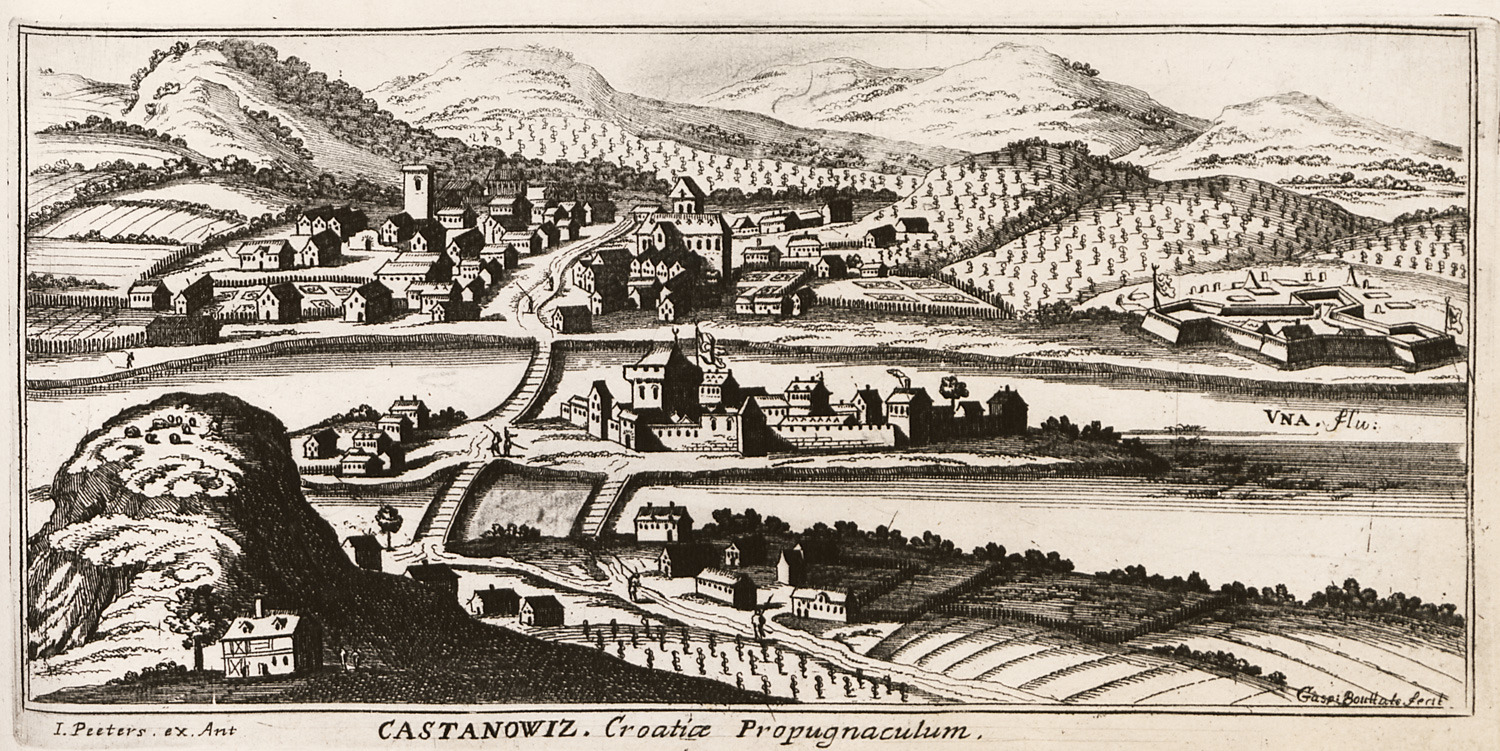
Town of Kostajnica and its fortress in 1686.

In 1685, Croatian ban Erdody gave strategic importance to Una river, where he hoped to push Croatian line of defence from its current positions on Kupa river. As a first step, he considered the capture of Dubica fort. In summer of 1685, he assembled his army and marched to Dubica. His infantry and cavalry crossed Una river due to shallow summer waters. As the army approached Dubica fort, the battle was becoming ever more violent. Since they had no artillery on their disposal, ban's soldiers somehow managed to swing some torch over fort's walls, which had set its interior ablaze. As a result, the Ottoman garrison left the fortification. Ban's army, then again crossed the river in order to meet the incoming Ottoman reinforcements on more favorable terms. Once these Ottoman reinforcements did arrive, they were again beaten by Erdody's army and pushed back into the river. The town of Krupa was also taken, after ban's army won a skirmish against local Turks.

==== Battles for Kostajnica ====
On 19 August 1686, Erdody again assembled his army in Turopolje and marched them off to Kostajnica. Despite engaging in battle, the army failed to capture Kostajnica's fortress, because they had no artillery to breach its walls. In 1687, ban's army managed to take Kostajnica, as well as Zrin and Novi. The border with Ottoman Empire, was therefore once again pushed back to Una river as Erdody had planned.

=== Diet of Požun ===
After first failed attempt in 1684, Imperial Habsburg Armies managed to take Hungarian capital of Buda in 1686. Emperor Leopold therefore summoned Hungarian parliament in Požun in October 1687 in order to tie Hungary closer to his throne. The Diet of Požun recognised Habsburg rulers as legitimate rulers of Hungary. Since Croatian representatives on this diet demonstrated their loyalty to the Habsburgs, several Croatian nobles were promoted in the aftermath. These include members of families: Keglević, Ratkay, Jelačić of Bužim, Patačić, Ilijašić, as well as Pavao Ritter Vitezović who received the title of knight.

=== Operations in Lika and Krbava ===
==== Campaign of 1685 ====
In July 1685, General Joseph Herberstein of Karlovac generalcy took his troops on two chevauchee campaigns to Lika and Krbava. On lower levels, his troops were commanded by Franjo Oršić, Stjepan Vojnović of Ogulin, captain Ivan Juraj Gusić of Tounj, count Adam Purgstal and Marko Mesić. The campaign ended in destruction of Bunić fort and ravaging of surrounding villages. In September 1685, a second campaign was launched, this time towards the town of Grabunar in Lika. Lack of cannons forced the troops commanded by Franjo Oršić to burn the town down. The Ottoman troops in Grabunar attempted a sortie in order to fend off the attackers, but their attempt failed. The desperate Ottoman defenders used ropes to allow for women and children to escape, while troops which remained inside the fort were burnt to death.

==== Campaign of 1689 ====
In spring of 1689, Herberstein took his troops on another offensive in Lika and Krbava. His army consisted of Frontier troops from Senj, Karlobag, Otočac and Brinje, as well as armed peasants. Among them was also priest Marko Mesić, acting as both front row fighter and a spiritual leader. This joint army marched off from Karlobag across Velebit mountain which they crossed through Oštarije pass and eventually reached Lički Novi on June 15. In Novi, there was a first Ottoman fort on their way. The Novi garrison immediately surrendered, and on the next day, all of the Islamic population from Novi, also withdrew to Udbina.

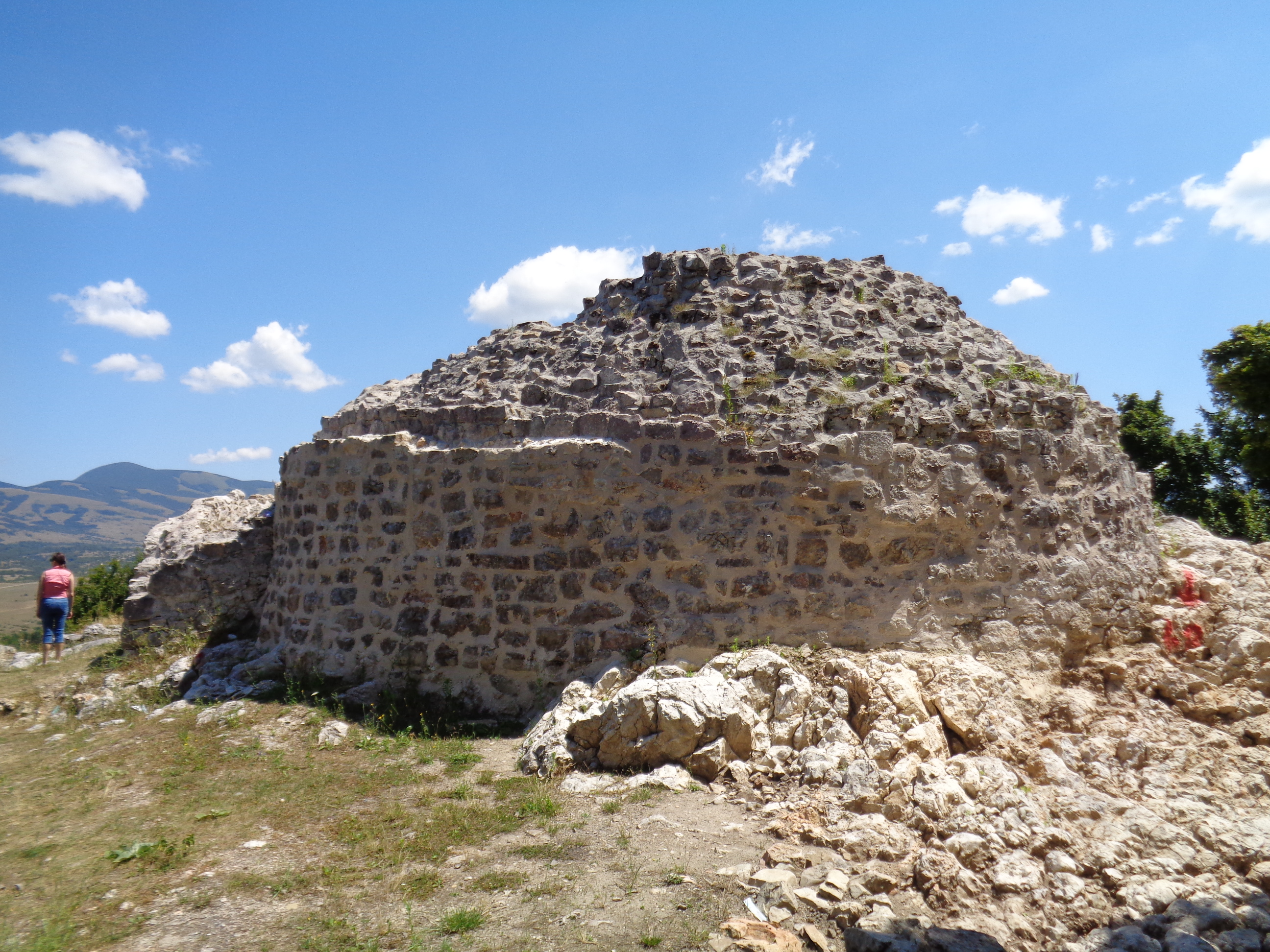
Ruins of old Udbina castle, a final Ottoman stronghold in Lika in 1689.

When news about the fall of Novi spread throughout Lika, troops from other nearby Ottoman outposts, such as Ribnik, also withdrew to Udbina. The Ottoman garrison in the well-fortified Bilaj stronghold decided to resist the Christian army. However, upon being bombarded by cannon fire for two days, Bilaj garrison surrendered too, when received permission to withdraw peacefully. Surrender of outpost of Budak followed, as well as Perušić, which surrendered on June 30, when its garrison was allowed to pull out peacefully too. The Christian army then continued their advance on Bunić and Udbina. In Bunić, Ottoman garrison burnt down its own fortifications and withdrew to Udbina. At that point, Udbina became the sole remaining stronghold under Ottoman control in Lika.

On 2 July, Christian army marched on through Pločanski klanac, thus arriving before Udbina stronghold. In front of Udbina some 300 Turks attempted to skirmish with the Herberstein's army, after which they probably retreated behind Udbina walls.

==== Siege of Udbina ====
Herberstein besieged Udbina on 3 July 1689, after surrounding the stronghold completely. Nonetheless, he did not order his troops to charge at Udbina walls in order to avoid losses. Stronghold of Udbina was defended by some 500 Ottoman defenders, and was well supplied with food.

However, Herberstein learnt from some fleeing refugee that Ottoman troops inside Udbina do not have a source of drinking water. He therefore decided to thirst the defenders into surrender. Ottomans attempted several sorties in order to reach the nearby water sources, resulting in skirmishes with the Christian troops, but to no avail. At 4 July, some Ottoman cannon nearly killed Herberstein while he was moving around the fort on his horse.

By 17 July, the thirst inside Udbina was so grave that Ottoman defenders apparently had to resort to drinking animal blood. After 18 days of siege, when defenders lost all hope of relief army coming to their aid from Bihać, the dehydrated Udbina garrison finally decided to surrender to Herberstein's army. They did so by sending some slave from Gorski Kotar called Luka as a messenger. In return for Herberstein accepting their surrender, Ottomans had to leave behind all their weaponry; cannons, banners and large rifles, as well as a group of hostages. Their surrender was finalized on July 21 1689, which marked the liberation of entire region of Lika from the Ottomans. Herberstein returned to Karlovac on 23 July via Plaški.

=== Operations in Turkish Croatia ===
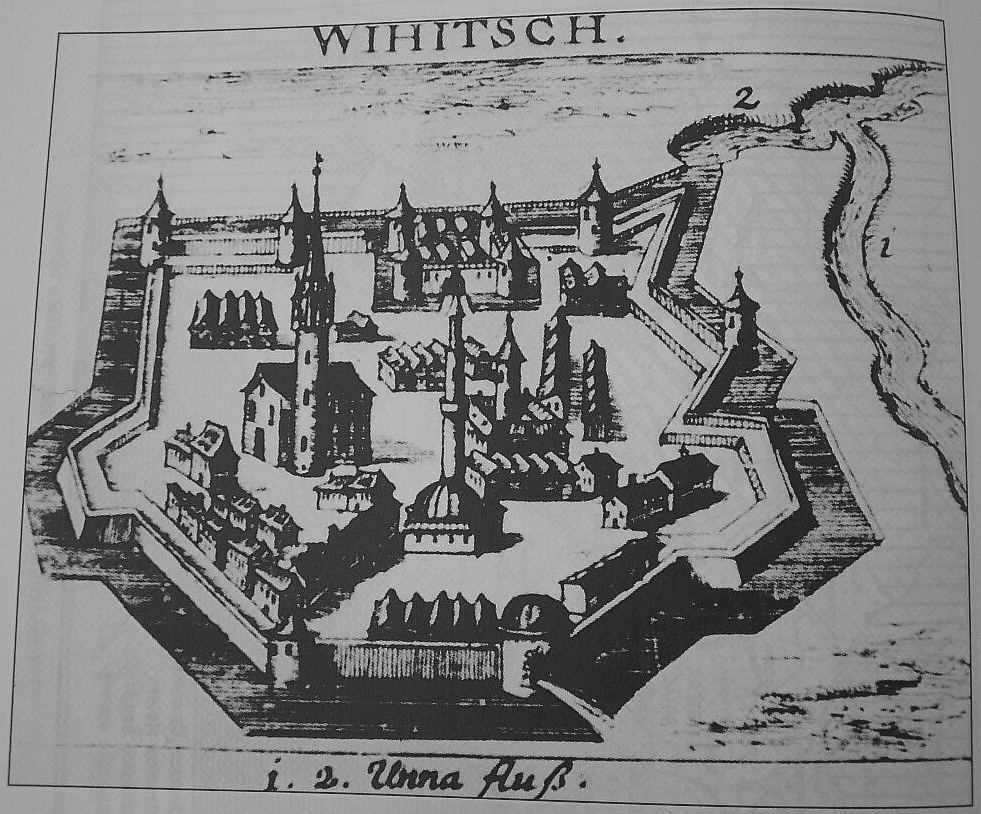
Bihać fort in 1686, with Una river next to it.

The town of Bihać was an important strongpoint in Croatian defence from the Ottoman expansion during the 16th century, however it was captured by the Ottomans in 1592 and subsequently incorporated into their Eyalet of Bosnia. In June 1697, troops of Croatian Military Frontier made an attempt of reconquista. The army raised to besiege Bihać, managed to take outlying Ottoman outposts of Drežnik and Bila Stina before reaching Bihać. The Siege of Bihać itself, however, turned out to be unsuccessful and further attempts of capturing it were eventually called off. According to Croatian historian Vjekoslav Klaić, due to peace negotiations starting some one year later, Croatians lost all hope of taking back Bihać.

== Aftermath ==
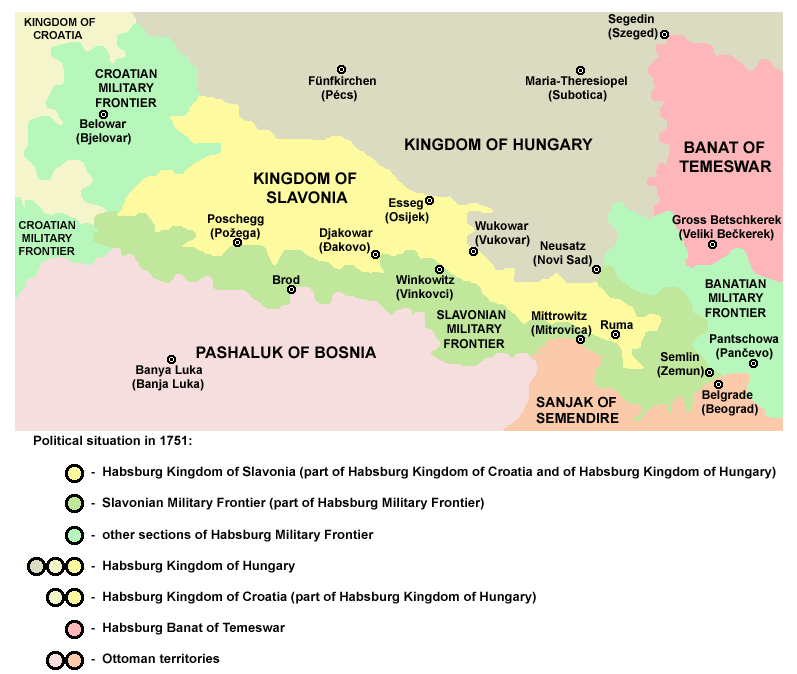
Territories of Slavonia following Treaty of Karlowitz in 1699.

=== Kingdom of Slavonia ===
The Peace of Karlowitz, was signed in 1699 between the two warring empires, which confirmed the liberation of entire Slavonia from the Ottomans. Although emperor Leopold made promises that newly liberated territories will fall under jurisdiction of Croatian ban, in the end the imperial Court Financial Chamber grabbed real political power. Since there was also a substantial military importance of these lands, the powerful military authorities also kept their influence in Slavonia, therefore Chamber's and military authorities in Slavonia actually intermingled, which caused conflicts between them. Kingdom of Slavonia was therefore made a separate Habsburg land under joint civil-military administration which lasted from 1699 to 1745.

On demographic picture, due to five years of permanent and destructive warfare, after wars ceased, the lands of Slavonia remained almost empty. While Islamic population left these lands, these people were subsequently substituted with Christian (Croatian, German and Hungarian) population. After Eugene of Savoy, made his incursion in Bosnia and burnt down Sarajevo in 1687, a large group of Christian settlers, fleeing from the Ottoman reprisal settled in Slavonia.

=== Status of Lika and Krbava ===
After the Ottomans were routed from Lika and Krbava- in 1689, there was a dispute on who should govern these newly liberated lands. Even though Croatian-Slavonian Parliament regularly laid claims to its old counties of Lika-Krbava and even had appointed Petar Ricciardi as their prefect, with Pavao Ritter Vitezović appointed as a vice-prefect, this was disputed by military commanders of Karlovac generalcy, Austrian nobility and imperial Court Financial Chamber. In February 1693, Court Financial Chamber sold Lika-Krbava and Karlobag to count Adolf Zinzedorf, who in 1693 presented himself to Croatian Parliament and pledged an oath putting the Lika-Krbava under the jurisdiction of Croatian ban and Parliament. Habsburgs, on the other hand did at one point considered incorporating these lands back into Kingdom of Croatia, but in the end opinion prevailed that only Zrinski and Frankopan family had right to lay their claim on these lands. Since they were eliminated as a result of magnate conspiracy, their eventual decision was to incorporate these territories into Karlovac Generalcy of Croatian Military Frontier in 1712. Majority of islamic population which decided to remain in these lands was converted to Christian faith.

=== Status of Banska krajina ===
Up until 1703, the status of Banska krajina remained undefined since it was not possible to reconcile the interests of Austrian military authorities, Croatian feudal elites and newly settled Vlach population. In 1703, the Imperial decree gave Croatian nobility wide spectre of authorities in this region.

== See also ==
- Military history of Croatia
- Hundred Years' Croatian–Ottoman War
