= Osijek Campaign =

Habsburg offensive in the Great Turkish War

1685 Osijek Campaign
- Part of Croatian-Slavonian-Dalmatian theater in Great Turkish War
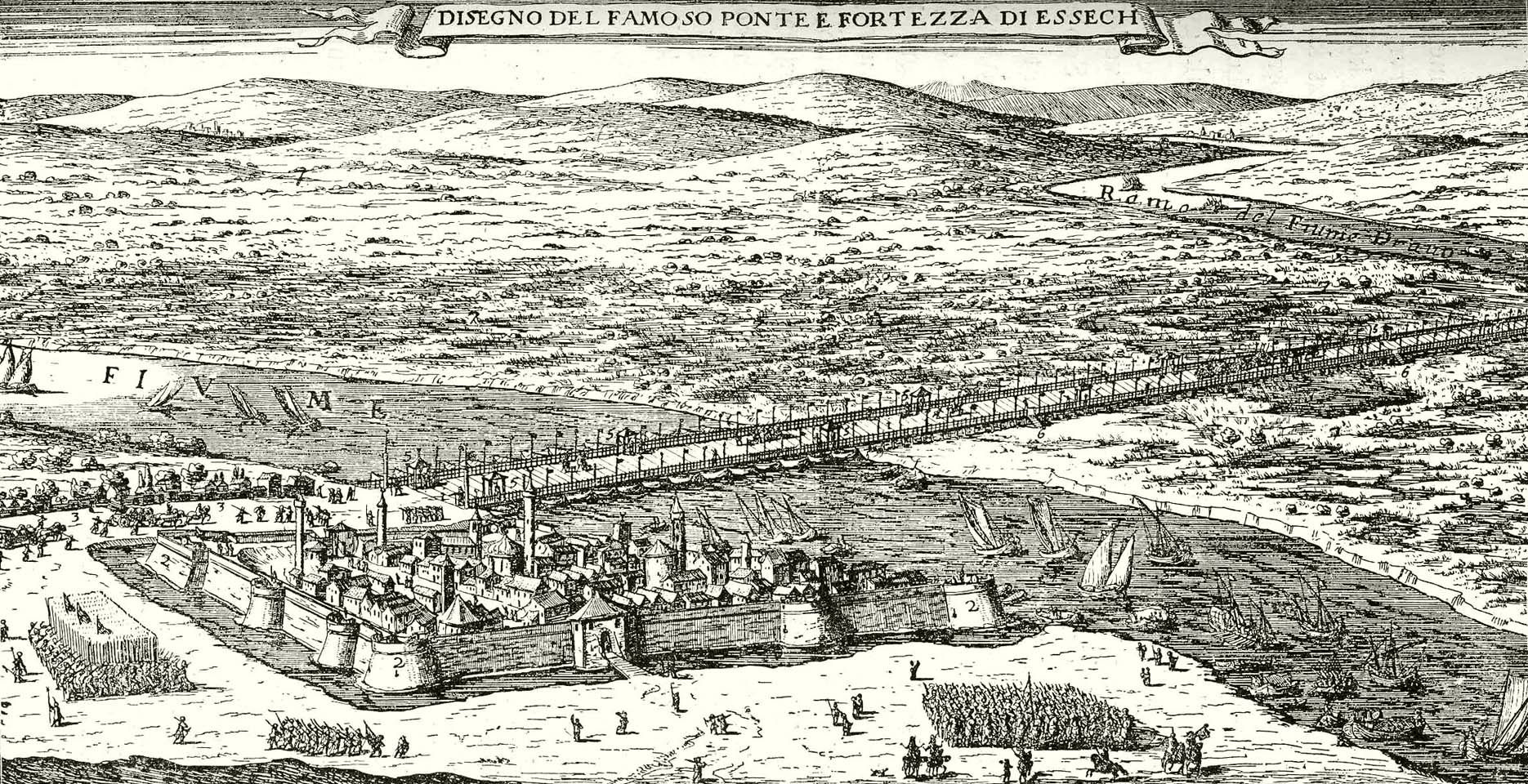
- The fortified town of Osijek and its wooden bridge in 1687.
| Date | August 1685 |
| Location | Sanjak of Pojega, modern-day Slavonia, Croatia |
| Result | Croatian army victory |

Belligerents
| Habsburg Monarchy; Kingdom of Croatia | Ottoman Empire |

Commanders and leaders
| James Leslie; Gašpar Balog; Stjepan Patačić † | Unknown |

Strength
| Six infantry and cavalry regiments Army of Croatian ban (2,000 men) and 3 light cannons | Unknown |

Casualties and losses
| Unknown | Unknown |

Osijek Campaign of 1685 was a successful Habsburg-Croatian raid towards the town of Osijek in Ottoman held Slavonia. Although the campaign inside enemy territory ended in a tactical victory for Habsburg-Croatian troops, James Leslie, the commander in charge, decided for a tactical withdrawal after reaching Osijek and defeating one Ottoman army there, because he lacked sufficient heavy weapons to besiege Osijek's main fort.

== Prelude ==
After the Ottoman Empire attempted to besiege Vienna in 1683 and failed, the Holy League was formed, and allied Christian powers decided to begin the Great Turkish War against the Ottoman Empire. In the Croatian-Slavonian theatre of operations, the army of the Croatian ban (viceroy), commanded by James Leslie, a Scotsman and 26th Baron of Balquain in the service of the Habsburg Imperial Army successfully captured the town of Virovitica in 1684 and turned it into an outpost for further incursions inside Slavonia.

In August 1685, Leslie again assembled his army and began another campaign, this time deeper inside Ottoman-held Slavonia.

== The Incursion ==
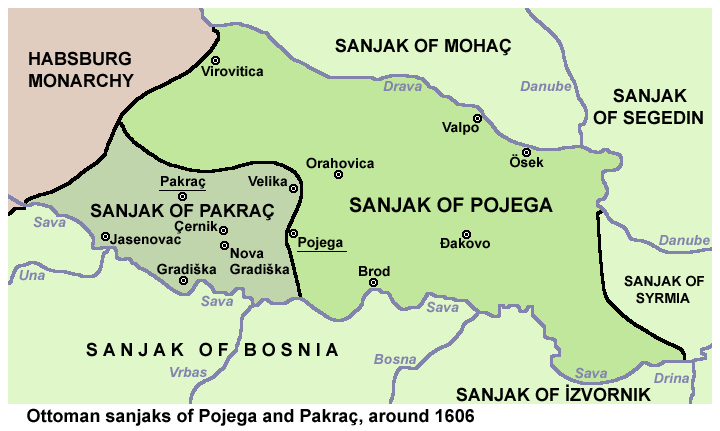
After capturing Virovitica in 1684, in August following year, the Habsburg army commanded by James Leslie set out on another incursion in Slavonia, this time reaching Osijek (Ösek).

On 9 August Leslie's army began another thrust inside Slavonia towards Osijek. At a time, this Slavonian town was a vital Ottoman hub in the region and also an important crossroad that connected the roads leading from Slavonia to Hungary. Leslie's army, however, progressed slowly due to the scorching summer heat. Two days later, a vanguard of 500 cavalrymen commanded by captain Gašpar Balog attacked Miholjac, whose garrison quickly surrendered to Balog. He then captured prisoners shut inside a tower and assigned 300 soldiers to guard them.

On 12 August the main army under Leslie's command reached Karašica river, where they encamped. At 10 in the morning, the vanguard informed Leslie of Ottoman troops marching out from Osijek and heading towards them, so Leslie prepared manoeuvres. He instructed his men to fire their cannons and march in different directions to make it look as if they were larger in number than they really were. In the meantime, had Leslie learned from a peasant that a few days previously Ottoman troops had indeed marched out from Osijek to Valpovo. Still, when they found out about the presence of Leslie's army, they pulled back across the Karašica river.

Not wanting to allow the Ottomans to burn down any bridge across the Karašica river, the cavalrymen of the Croatian vanguard charged at the Turks and inflicted losses on them. In this bloody skirmish Ivanić, captain Stjepan Patačić and dozens of other men were killed. However, the Ottomans ultimately withdrew behind the safety of the Osijek walls.

=== The Battle of Osijek ===
On 13 August Leslie's main army reached Osijek and encamped there. He again erected a large camp for 30,000 men to make it look like his army was larger than it really was. He formed his army in battle order by positioning his infantry, German cavalry, chamber and artillery in the centre while placing his Croatian cavalry on both flanks. The Ottoman army consisting of infantry and cavalry, came out to meet them and formed their own battle line. The two armies then started slowly approaching each other. When they came close, Croatian cavalry swiftly attacked both flanks of the enemy army, routing them. As Croatians continued to pursue them, the Ottoman troops withdrew in panic inside to the Osijek fort. Meanwhile, Leslie's main army continued to approach them while maintaining their battle order until they reached the palanka of Osijek.

On 14 August Leslie continued the reconnaissance around Osijek and ordered some 13 nearby watermills to be burnt down. He also decided to burn down the wooden Suleiman bridge across the Drava river near Osijek.

== The Aftermath ==
Since he lacked resources to besiege the main Osijek fort, Leslie first had the Osijek palanka burnt down, then decided to retreat his army back to Virovitica on 14 August due to the concern of being cut off from behind. On the morning of 15 August his army completed the withdrawal. The word of Leslie's success near Osijek soon spread around Europe, so the bishop of Passau, for example, held a thanksgiving mass upon hearing the news. The news also reached Milan, where commemorative flyers about the offensive were printed.
