= Siege of Bihać (1697) =

Part of the Great Turkish War

Coordinates: 44°48′54.8″N 15°52′9.4″E

- Part of Croatian-Slavonian-Dalmatian theater in Great Turkish War
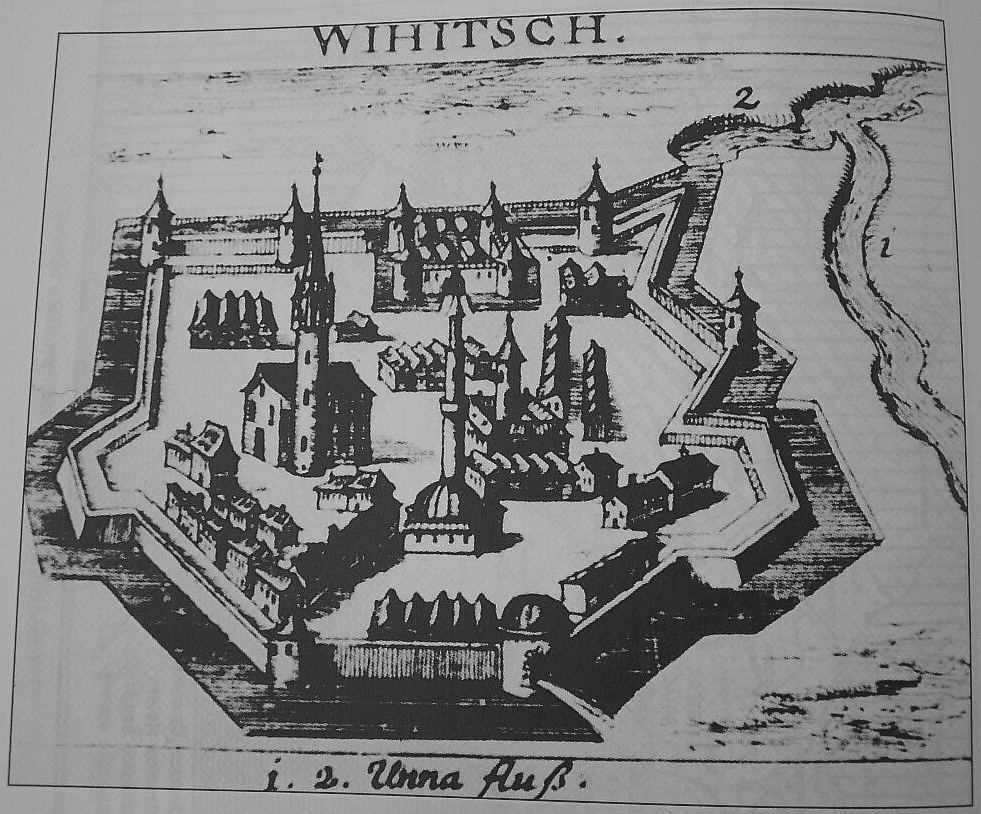
- Bihać fortress in 1686.
Date	June–August 1697
Location	Bihać, Eyalet of Bosnia, Ottoman Empire (modern day Bosnia and Herzegovina)
Result	Ottoman victory

Belligerents
Habsburg monarchy: Kingdom of Croatia	Ottoman Empire; Bosnia Eyalet

Commanders and leaders
Karl Auersperg; Adam II. Batthyány; Ivan Andrija Makar; Marko Mesić	Halil Pasha

Strength
20,000 strong Croatian ban's army Five imperial regiments	3,500 infantry 500 cavalry

Casualties and losses
High	Unknown

Siege of Bihać (1697) was a Habsburg siege of the Ottoman fortress town of Bihać in Bosnian Krajina (aka Turkish Croatia). The siege was planned as a diversionary attack from main Habsburg offensive on Danube river, and was called off after several failed storming attempts.

== Background ==
In the first half of 16th century, the town of Bihać was an important Croatian strongpoint in its defensive efforts to counter westwards Ottoman expansion. The town was besieged by the Ottomans in 1592, and eventually surrendered. It subsequently became an important Ottoman outpost for further expansion on the expense of Croatia and other Habsburg lands. Nonetheless, the Ottoman expansion towards Croatia was mostly halted by the decisive Battle of Sisak in 1593.

By the second half of 17th century, the Ottoman Empire lost the might it had one century earlier. Nonetheless, the Ottoman Porte decided to go on another offensive and mounted an offensive against Habsburg capital Vienna in 1683, which culminated in Battle of Vienna and Ottoman defeat.

Following this defeat, the military alliance called the Holy League was formed, whose purpose was to push the Ottomans out of Europe. Parallel with main Habsburg efforts against Ottoman Hungary, ban of Croatia and Karlovac Generalcy began their own successful anti-Ottoman campaigns in Slavonia, Pounje and Lika.

=== Preparations ===
In the aftermath of reconquista of Lika in 1689, Habsburg authorities and Imperial War Council recognised the strategic importance of Bihać as both potential defence post of Lika as well as forward outpost for further offensive operations in Turkish Croatia and rest of Bosnia. Joseph Herberstein's Karlovac generalcy frontier troops made several raid to Bihać area back in 1689, but since they lacked the siege engines, they did not attempt to conquer Bihać fort.

In June 1697, the Frontier Army commanded by Karl Auersperg was assembled in Slunj, and marched off to Drežnik. Right in front of Ottoman held Drežnik, the Frontier forces met with Marko Mesić's Lika troops. After being pounded by cannon fire, the Drežnik garrison surrendered to Auersperg. Drežnik was then manned by Croatians, after which the joint Frontier-Lika army continued its march to Bihać. The arrival of ban's army was complicated due to them breaking through Pounje, where they captured and burnt down Bile Stine. Although intelligence reports described town being deserted and its fortifications in bad shape, once Christian army came there, these reports turned out to be false.

== Siege ==
After deploying infantry and artillery around Bihać, the town was completely surrounded throughout the next two days. At the same time, reconnaissance parties were sent across Una river, to look for arrival of any Ottoman relief armies heading towards besieged Bihać. First Croatian troops led by general Ivan Andrija Makar arrived on June 16, while Croatian ban Batthyany arrived near Bihać on June 20. General Heister of Varaždin generalcy also arrived to the siege the same day. Besieging commanders intentionally attempted to spread false information about Bosnian pasha's relief army sent to Bihać's aid being destroyed. Croatian ban dispatched his troops on right bank of Una river towards mount Grmeč, in order to secure the background from the arrival of petential relief army. General Makar did the same in Ripač gorge, where encirclement wasn't yet completed.

On 24 June the Habsburg commanders estimated that artillery bombardment did enough damage to the town's fortifications so they ordered to charge the city from all sides. Some fifty men led by baron Bourscheidt managed to break into the city through cracks in the walls, however, the Ottoman defenders offered very strong resistance and managed to repulse the attackers. When this attack was repulsed, the Christians suffered high casualties with more than 300 men killed. This sank the morale of the attacking army, while at the same time it raised the morale of Bihać Ottoman defenders. On June 28 Habsburg sappers attempted to blow up town's ditch, but the Ottomans somehow used the opportunity to make a sortie on the Habsburg camp which inflicted even more damage to the attackers.

On June 29 the disappointed Croatian ban became sick, so he decided to withdraw, although his troops apparently continued the siege. Rumours also started to circulate that Bosnian pasha is preparing a 6000 strong relief force, with more Ottoman reinforcements arriving from Belgrade. Quarrels also appeared between Germans and Croatians in the imperial army. In the end, the order came from Vienna to abandon the siege completely, in order to re-deploy these attacking troops to the Habsburg main offensive. On 3 July, the siege was completely called off. The Habsburg armies withdrew from the battlefield on 8 July, after previously annihilating Ripač and Izačić. The remains of Habsburg army which previously besieged Bihać subsequently joined other imperial forces for their offensives in Hungary.

== Aftermath ==
In assessing the failed siege of Bihać, Croatian historian Radoslav Lopašić notes that lack of coordination and incompetence of main commanders in charge made all efforts of retaking Bihać futile. He also mentions the German sources which criticise clumsy Croatian landsturm. The town was, as he describes, successfully defended from a strong Christian army by a rather small group of Muslim defenders "enthusiastic for their prophet's faith".

The failure of Siege of Bihać caused disappointment in Croatia. Historian Vjekoslav Klaić points out that when one year later emperor Leopold decided to conclude Peace treaty of Karlowitz, "The Croats lost all hope of liberating Bihać [...] which was considered the capital of Old Croatia in the aftermath of fall of Knin" in 1522.
