= Vjekoslav Prebeg =

Former Croatian soldier and Ukrainian marine

- Born: 5 June 1982 (age 44); Zagreb, Yugoslavia
- Military career
- Allegiance: Croatia; Ukraine
- Branch: Croatian Army; Ukrainian Navy
- Units: Guards Mechanized Brigade (Croatia); Ukrainian Marines, 1st Separate Marine Battalion
- Conflicts: Russo-Ukrainian War; War in Donbass; Russian invasion of Ukraine; Siege of Mariupol
- Awards: Order for Courage, Third Class

Vjekoslav Prebeg is a former Croatian and Ukrainian soldier.

== Biography ==
Prebeg was born in Zagreb in 1982. According to his sister, ever since he was a child he wanted to become a soldier. When he was younger he attempted to join the French Foreign Legion, but failed selection. He spent five years serving in the Croatian 1st Mechanized Battalion "Tigers" as a professional soldier, until realising that he will likely not be promoted. He subsequently left Croatia and joined the Ukrainian marines around 2020. In Ukraine he also found a girlfriend, Irina, who escaped to France as a refugee when invasion started.

=== Siege of Mariupol ===
As the invasion started on 24 February, his unit on the frontline only managed to hold initial Russian onslaught for 12 hours, when they were given orders to withdraw. During thair withdrawal, he said that a lack of adequate anti-tank weapons proved to be a major problem. They gradually kept withdrawing, until from early March they ended up surrounded by the Russians in Mariupol kettle.

On 28 February 2022, he announced on his Facebook profile that he will be going offline from social networks to avoid being located by the enemy. As the situation became unbearable, he and group of his fellow soldiers attempted to reach Ukrainian controlled territory across Russian controlled territory. He said: "We left Mariupol and walked and hid for 260 kilometers, while trying to avoid every possible contact. We walked only by night." Their extraction plan failed when his group encountered a Russian artillery unit and decided to surrender.

=== Captivity ===
After his release, he assessed that regular Russian troops which originally captured his group treated them rather correctly, but the harassment started when they were handed over to DNR militia. Militants posed him questions like: "Why did Croatian Army sent you here? What kind of equipment do you use?" - to which he responded that he is not active member of Croatian Army, but Ukrainian Army and that he doesn't know. Subsequently, some Russian major, and general took over the interrogation who were, according to him, convinced that "he was some major spy". He was subsequently show-trialed by the DNR along with British nationals John Harding, Andrew Hill, Dylan Healy and a Swede Mathias Gustavsson. They were accused of being "foreign mercenaries" by separatist court. As the trial started Croatian Ministry of Foreign Affairs issued the statement saying that they: "reject the indictment which they do not consider legal due to not being in accordance with international law and international conventions on how to deal with captured civilians and prisoners of war". After being captured, Prebeg's Facebook profile was used to spread Russian propaganda and was massively spammed by mostly Serb nationals who celebrated his capture by the Russians. Serb journalist Miodrag Zarković, who openly supports Russian aggression on Ukraine was given permission by Russians to interview Prebeg in captivity. After being released from captivity Prebeg sait that right before this interview by the Serbs, he was heavily beaten by the guards. Bosnian fact checking portal Raskrinkavanje.ba wrote that aforementioned interviews served to spread Russian propaganda, and that several regional medias spread disinformation based on these interviews by describing Prebeg as Azov fighter, although he clearly stated that he wasn't. Prebeg later said in an interview to Croatian media that his captors tortured him with electricity, beat him and performed mock executions on him. In his interview in Podcast Inkubator on 13 March 2023, Prebeg said that DNR indictment of him as a "mercenary" lasted until Russians searched his phone found his contract with official Ukrainian institutions.Then he was given a status of witness on the court as Russian Federation officially did not want to participate in this trial. For a while, Prebeg shared a prison cell with a Brit Aiden Aslin who claimed that Prebeg deterred him from suicidal thoughts.

=== Release ===
Prebeg was released from Russian captivity after mediation of Saudi Arabian prince Mohammed bin Salman, along with dozens of other former Ukrainian international fighters. He arrived back to Croatia on 22 September 2022, after which Croatian doctors checked his health in Clinical Hospital Dubrava.

== See also ==
- List of Croatian soldiers
