= Davor Jović =

- Born: Davor Jović; 1 April 1956; Duge Njive, Yugoslavia
- Died: 27 November 2017 (aged 61); Vrgorac, Croatia
- Children: 2
- Military career
- Allegiance: Croatia
- Branch: Croatian National Guard; Croatian Army
- Service years: 1991–2003
- Rank: Major
- Unit: 4th Guards Brigade
- Conflicts: Croatian War of Independence • Operation Tiger • Operation Maslenica • Operation Storm; War in Bosnia • Battle of Mostar • Operation Mistral • Operation Southern Move

Davor Jović (1 April 1956 – 27 November 2017) was a prominent Croatian soldier, kickboxer and kickboxing trainer.

== Early life ==
Before Croatian War of Independence Jović worked in company Metal-Plastika from Makarska. He was also a champion of Yugoslavia in full-contact in 1984 and 1989 and worked as a bouncer in night clubs.

== Croatian War of Independence ==
In 1991 he joined Croatian National Guard where, at first, he was assigned to do the physical preparation of Croatian soldiers. He took part in Battle of Barracks, after which his company was transferred to 4th Guards Brigade of Croatian Army. He soon again saw action at battlefields near Zadar and Mostar in 1992. He survived a chemical attack near Mostar when Yugoslav People Army's aviation dropped poison gas on him and his men, which took toll on his liver. Nevertheless, that same year he took part in Operation Tiger whose goal was to push Serb forces away from Dubrovnik towards inner Herzegovina. During the course of action, he was severely wounded while he was attempting to fire M80 Zolja at enemy machine gun nest. His fellow soldiers carried him for 3 hours across the rough stone terrain towards the nearest hospital.

By 1993, he recovered and was again leading Croatian attack in Operation Maslenica, during which he stepped on a mine while he was carrying his wounded comrade. As he was second time wounded, hospital doctors wanted to give him eighty percent disability status which would prevent him to go back in action. He rejected that saying he wants to go back to the battlefield, so doctors gave him "only" fifty percent disability. Afterwards, that same year he spent six months in officers school in Zagreb after which he returned to 4th Guards Brigade, where he remained until the end of war.

== Post war ==
In 1997, he took part in 76 kilometers long soldier marathon that he won after running for eight hours and seventeen minutes. He ended the run being "eight kilos lighter" and losing all ten nails on his feet. This victory earned him the title of "The Best Soldier of Croatian Armed Forces". He retired from Croatian Army in 2003 and founded a Kickboxing club "Sveti Jure" in Vrgorac. He was a close friend of Croatian general and Defence Minister Damir Krstičević.

== Death ==
In November 2017, Jović felt ill as he was driving his car and soon lost consciousness. He died before the paramedics could help him, at the age of 61. His funeral was attended by 2,500 people including Damir Krstičević who also came in a role of special envoy of Prime Minister Andrej Plenković, mountaineer Stipe Božić, Dragan Primorac and many other prominent Croats.

== See also ==
- Ante Gotovina
- Blago Zadro
- Marko Babić
- List of Croatian soldiers
