= Ivan Andrija Makar =

17-century Croatian general

Ivan Andrija Makar of Makarska
- Born: around year 1640; Križevci, Kingdom of Croatia, Habsburg Monarchy
- Died: 1700
- Spouse: Sidonija Sofman
- Military career
- Allegiance: Croatia; Habsburg Monarchy; Diocese of Zagreb
- Rank: general
- Unit: Haramije
- Conflicts: Great Turkish War • Battle of Velika Monastery • Siege of Bihać

Ivan Andrija Makar of Makarska (c. 1640–1700) was a 17th-century Croatian general, Habsburg Military Frontier commander, Križevci capitancy commander and haramije leader.

== Biography ==
Makar was born in Kreževci, somewhere around 1640. He began his military career after finishing regular military schools. In 1682, before the beginning of Great Turkish War, he challenged Ottoman captain of Virovitica on a duel which ended in decapitation of his enemy.

He distinguished himself in Slavonian and Hungarian campaigns of Great Turkish War. In 1684, he liberated Orahovica, after routing the local Ottoman garrison. In 1686, he again led Croatian troops on campaign in Slavonia, where his army scored victory over that of Funduk-pasha of Bosnia. In same year, he again led Croatian troops across Drava river, where men under his command participated in liberation of Szigetvar from the Ottomans in 1686. He was subsequently appointed Szigetvar fort commander. Same year he took part in combat around Pécs and Kaposvár. Makar and his men attacked Pecs in October, successfully routing the Ottomans from the town. The enemy then withdrew to the fort which Makar and his men couldn't take due to lack of artillery. They were therefore forced to wait for the arrival of Louis, Margrave of Baden who disposed with the siege equipment. After several days of artillery bombardment the Turks surrendered. Makar was appointed Pecs commander, as well as the commander of Croat regiment which he himself personally recruited. A Makar hill near Pecs was named after him, in honour of his victory against the Ottomans.

Emperor Leopold Habsburg granted him noble status in 1687, which made him "baron Ivan Makar de Makarska".

In winter of 1690, large Ottoman army crossed Sava river and after some fighting Makar and his men again established control over most of Slavonia including Požega. By the order of Croatian ban Nikola Erdody, Croatian troops under Makar's command were again dispatched next year to Slavonia. After Makar and his soldiers chased most of the army down, the remaining Ottomans took defensive positions in Velika Francisian monastery. In order to eliminate these Ottoman invaders, Makar had the whole monastery burnt down. Although, this solved the problem with the Ottoman invaders, the destruction of the monaestery, also caused major damage to Francisian monks in Slavonia. Between 1694 and 1696 he was appointed commander of Novi fort and Zrin fort. He was subsequently collaborating with Luka Ibrišimović in putting the liberated territory of Slavonia under the control of Diocese of Zagreb.

In the late stages of Great Turkish War, Makar held military command over Virovitica-Požega region. He died in year 1700, after he wrote his last will on 5 November of the same year.
