= Haramije =

Croatian infantry

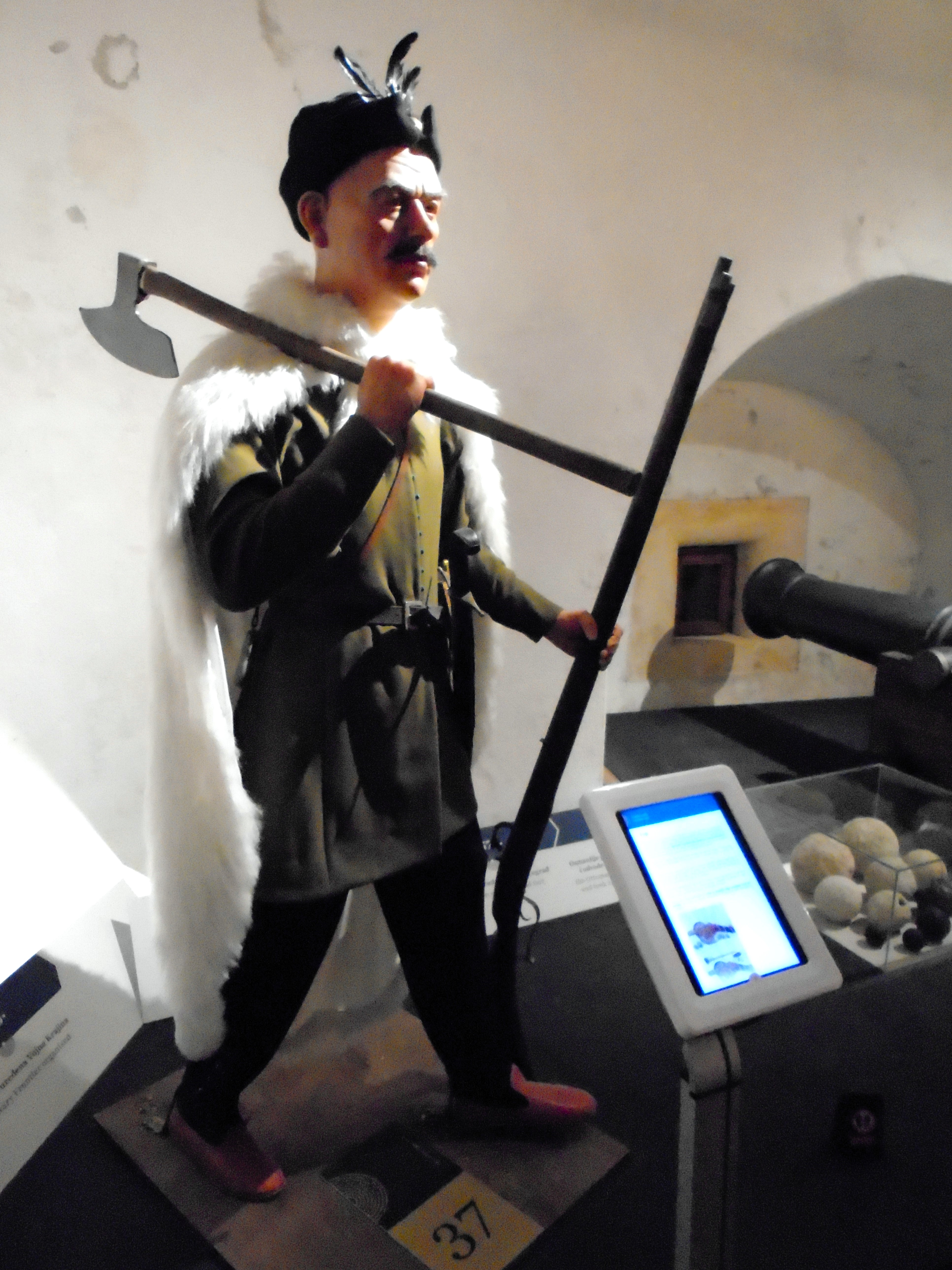
Exhibit of a haramija in the Međimurje County Museum in Čakovec

Haramije (tur. haramî: bandit, outlaw < arap. ḥarāmiyy: outlaw, punk), were lightly armed Croatian infantry. They were founded in 1539 to serve as a countermeasure against Ottoman incursions inside Croatian territory.

== Context ==
Throughout the 16th century Croatia and Slavonia suffered from frequent Ottoman martolos raids. These Ottoman troops recruited from Balkan Vlachs (and others) usually made incursions deep inside Croatian-Slavonian territory, in order to kidnap people living there, take them back across Ottoman side of the border and then sell them on the Ottoman slave markets.

=== Formation ===
Croatian-Slavonian Parliament, which assembled on 8 May 1539 in Dubrava issued the legislative to recruit 300 strong haramija force, also inspired by Ottoman martolos, and assemble them during the summer and autumn of this year. They would be recruited by Croatian ban (viceroy), who would then deploy them on appropriate locations throughout the country. In order to pay for these new troops, the new taxes were also imposed. Haramijas would then be deployed in Croatian-Slavonian forts throughout the country in order to pursue and intercept any Ottoman martolos, which they would encounter.

After foundation of Ban's Frontier, haramije became integrated in its defense system. They were commanded by dukes or Harambašas. Non-paid members of people's army, who guarded Slavonian borders facing the Ottoman Empire were also dubbed as Haramijas. The unit was disbanded in the 18th century, when Frontier Regiments were formed.

== Notable haramijas ==
- Ivan Andrija Makar
