= Luka Ibrišimović =

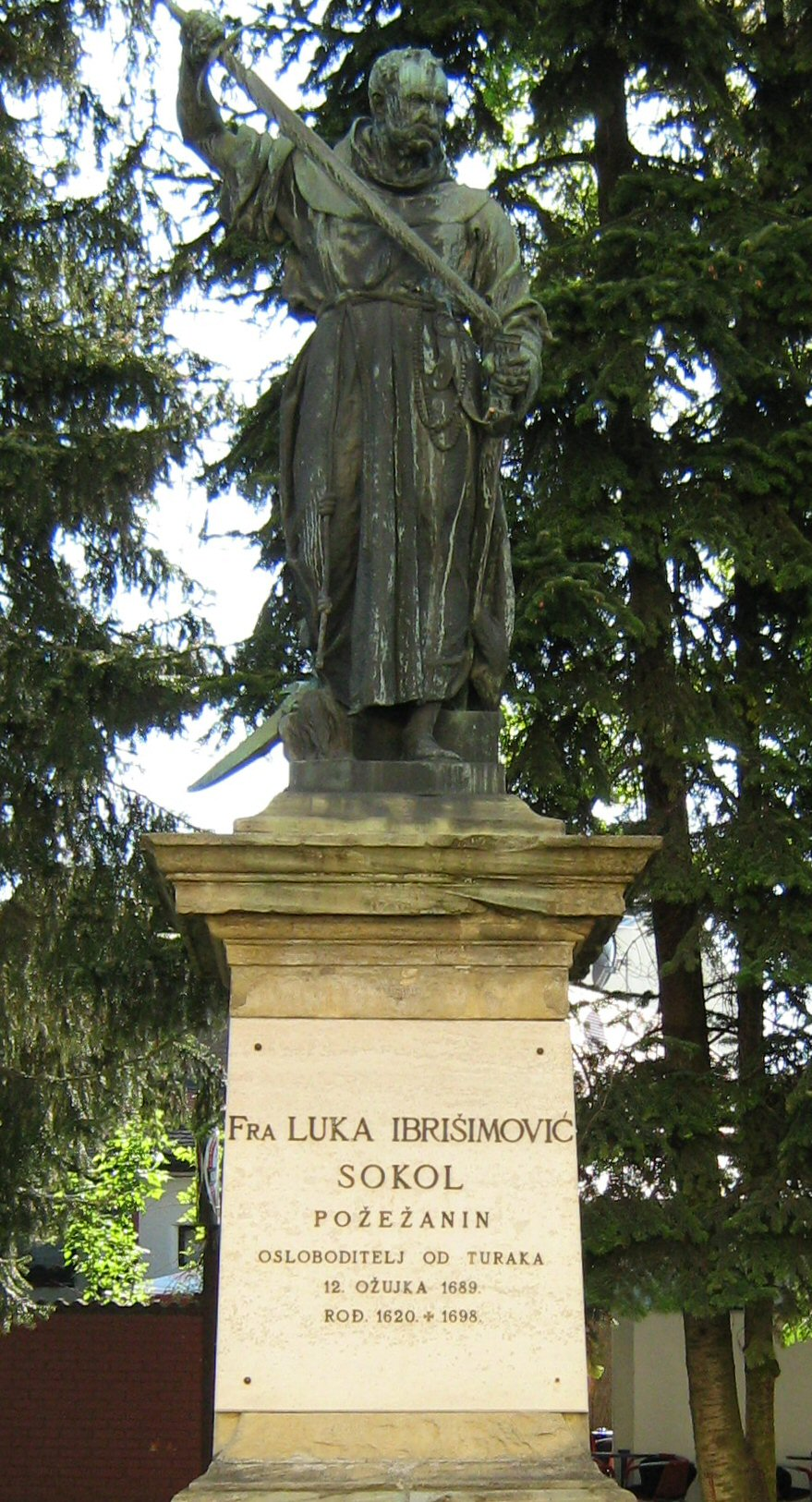
Luka Ibrišimović's statue in Požega.

Fra Luka Ibrišimović, O.F.M. (c. 1620 – March 1698) was a Croatian friar, cultural worker, soldier and a spy. He was best known for leading an uprising against Ottoman forces in Slavonia during the Great Turkish War.

== Biography ==
Ibrišimović was born in either Požega or Sibinj around 1620. He received his basic education in humanities, philosophy and theology at the Velika Monastery, while he received his higher education in Rome. Sometime around 1670, while Slavonia was still under Ottoman occupation, Ibrišimović founded a public school in Požega. Most of his work was centered around the town of Požega. In 1680, he was imprisoned by the Ottoman Pasha of Đakovo under accusations of treachery. However, through a combination of influence on his powerful friends among Ottoman officials as well as bribery, he managed to get out of the dungeon and thus avoided being impaled on a stake. He maintained live correspondences with external parties in Varaždin and Zagreb, informing them in his letters about Ottoman preparations in the region for the 1683 Vienna Campaign.

=== Great Turkish War ===
In 1684, after The Great Turkish War was launched, Ibrišimović's confidant Hrelja was captured by the Ottomans while smuggling information to the Christian troops. Both Hrelja and Ibrišimović were subsequently arrested, imprisoned and sentenced to impalement by the Ottoman authorities. However, the punishment was only conducted on Hrelja while Ibrišimović was ransomed by his fellow Francisians. After this, he joined Slavonian Christian rebels who were hiding in forests and planned a general insurrection against the Ottomans. Croatian historian Radoslav Lopašić considers that Ibrišimović probably spent his time between 1684 and 1688 amongst the rebels, since his correspondence in that period ceased.

==== Battle of Sokolovac ====
In early 1689, a few thousand men strong Ottoman army crossed the Sava river into Slavonia and besieged Požega. Although there were minimal Imperial troops present to confront the Turks, Ibrišimović assembled a local insurgent army which confronted the Turks on Sokolovac hill near Požega and defeated them. During the Battle of Sokolovac, Ibrišimović's rebels ambushed Ottomans in their camp during the night while they were asleep, inflicting many casualties. Local women were purported to have also taken part in the battle by throwing rocks on the heads of Ottoman soldiers as they were passing through narrow ravines and attacking them using sickles, scythes and pitchforks. The victory at Sokolovac earned Ibrišimović the nickname "Sokol" (Croatian for hawk).

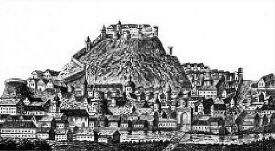
Fortress and city of Požega somewhere around year 1700.

Later in the same year, as another Ottoman army crossed the Sava into Slavonia, Ibrišimović and his men barricaded themselves in a fortified Franciscan monastery in Velika.

This was the starting point for the liberation of Slavonia following the arrival of general Makar's army in 1691. After the end of Ottoman rule, Ibrišimović organized the return of displaced people and the building of churches. At the late stages of the war. The liberation of Slavonia coincided with a movement to free Lika and Krbava led by Marko Mesić.

=== Death and memory ===
Ibrišimović died in Požega. The town still celebrates his victory as part of its festivities for St George's Day on 12 March.

== See also ==
- Marko Mesić
