= Siege of Virovitica (1684) =

Part of the Great Turkish War

- Part of Croatian-Slavonian-Dalmatian theater in Great Turkish War
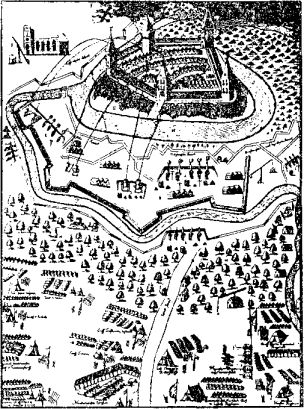
- Depiction of the siege from Karlsruhe archive.
Date	July 1684
Location	Sanjak of Pojega, modern day Slavonia, Croatia
Result	Croatian–Habsburg victory

Belligerents
Habsburg monarchy: Kingdom of Croatia	Ottoman Empire

Commanders and leaders
Gen. James Leslie; Gen. Sigismund Trautmansdorf; Nikola Erdody, ban of Croatia; Adam Zrinski; Ivan Drašković	Unknown

Strength
Some 8,000 Croatians; Cavalry of Croatian ban; Artillery batteries	Ottoman garrison of Virovitica; More than 200–strong reinforcements from Slatina

The siege of Virovitica was one of the first battles of the Croatian–Slavonian theater during the Great Turkish War. The siege took place in July 1684, and it ended with the Ottoman garrison's surrender and Habsburg-Croatian capture of Virovitica. Due to its capture in the early phase of the war, the town became a vital Habsburg base for further operations in Slavonia.

== Background ==
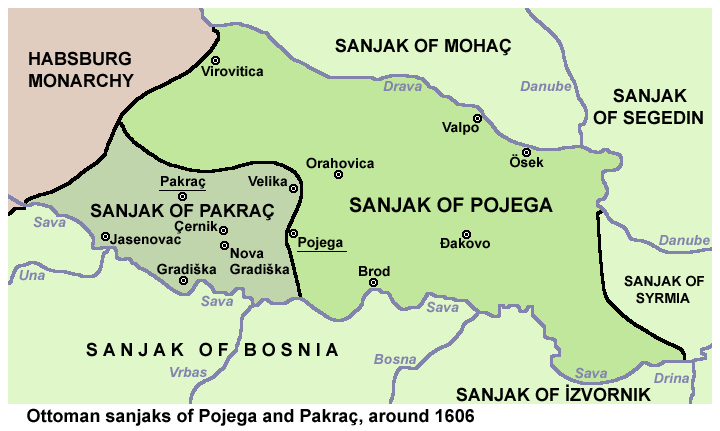
Sanjak of Požega, with Virovitica as its westernmost town close to the Habsburg border

In 1683, the twenty-year-long peace, concluded by the Vasvar peace treaty ended, and Ottoman Porte decided to renew its hostilities against the Habsburg Empire. The large Ottoman Army, attempted to capture the Habsburg capital of Vienna in 1683, but suffered a crushing defeat, which also ended with the formation of an anti-Ottoman alliance, The Holy League, and the beginning of the Great Turkish War.

Prior to the Great Turkish War, much of Hungary and Slavonia were conquered by the Ottomans, while Croatia was reduced to "remnants of the remnants" of what it once was. As a result of the Ottoman conquests, the center of the Croatian medieval state gradually moved northwards into Slavonia (Zagreb). Captured Croatian, Slavonian and Hungarian lands in previous centuries were made Ottoman sanjaks within the Ottoman Empire.

With the Imperial Habsburg Army launching its campaigns to recapture Hungary, through Croatia and its Military Frontier, armies of the Croatian ban and Frontier commanders, began their own preparations for an offensive campaigns into Ottoman-ruled Slavonia. The closest such lands were the territories of Sanjak of Požega, whose town of Virovitica represented the most frontal Ottoman fort, and thus also its most vulnerable outpost. Its capture by the Habsburgs would also permit further offensive actions directed towards Valpovo and Osijek.

By the end of June 1684, the war preparations began near Đurđevac. By the 3rd of July 1684. most of the Habsburg army was assembled and ready. Croatian ban Nikola Erdody, entrusted the supreme command of this army to general James Leslie(A Scotsman serving the Habsburg Imperial Army). As a preparatory measure, local military commanders also intentionally spread false rumors about their main armies heading to Hungary, instead of actually launching their own offensives in Slavonia.

== The siege ==
Leslie marched his army to Virovitica. Upon encamping there, he commenced an artillery bombardment against the city walls, using two batteries he had at his disposal. Nonetheless, the first few days of the siege proved unfruitful, due to the solid land barricades and other fortifications, which provided cover from the Croatian cannon fire. The town defenders also covered the raining projectiles with wet clothes in order to mitigate their destructiveness, while also repelling charges directed at the city.

Leslie then decided to further increase the pressure by ordering two infantry regiments to close off all approaches, encircling the town completely. The attacking army soon received news of Ottoman reinforcements on their way from Slatina, in order to lift the siege. Upon learning this, Leslie ordered general Trautmansdorf to take his army and intercept the incoming reinforcements. Trautmansdorf, therefore took his men on a forced march throughout the night and managed to surprise the relief force by successfully attacking them using his cavalry and infantry. In his surprise attack, Trautmansdorf's contingent took out large number of Turks, while also capturing at least 200 alive. The captured Turk prisoners were then marched back to Virovitica and brought out before the town defenders, thus letting them know they will receive no help. The town garrison, upon seeing the captured Turks of the relief party, while also receiving permission to leave town unharmed, decided to surrender to general Leslie on 25 July 1684.

== Aftermath ==
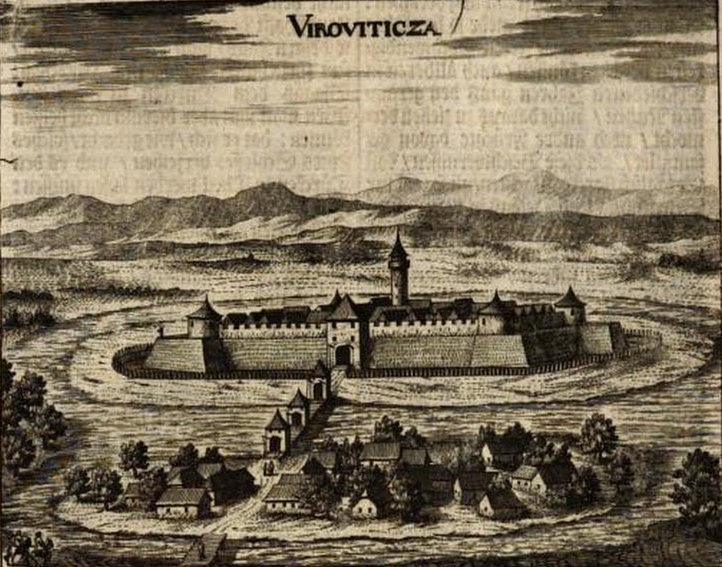
Virovitica fort in 1689, five years after the siege.

The capture of Virovitica became early major success for the Habsburg monarchy, which paved the way for launching new offensives towards Požega and even Osijek, Which was - at the time, a vital traffic and supply hub for the Ottoman-controlled Slavonia and Hungary. Imperial success at Virovitica also forced the Ottoman troops to withdraw towards Orahovica and Našice, while the locals burnt down houses of their former local Ottoman overlords.
