= Podcast Inkubator =

Croatian podcast

Presentation
- Hosted by: Ratko Martinović; Marko Petrak; Milan Stjelja
- Genre: Interview podcasts; Sports podcasts
- Language: Croatian
- Length: approx. 60 minutes

Production
- Production: MiS Studio
- Audio format: Podcast
- No. of episodes: 1100

Publication
- Original release: March 2017

Related
- Website: podcastinkubator.com

Podcast Inkubator is one of the most popular podcasts in Croatia and Southeast Europe. It is hosted by several different contributors, mostly local journalists, while the podcast production is handled by the MiS Studio.

== Background ==
Podcast Inkubator broadcast their first episode on YouTube in March 2017. The podcast began as a passion project of three journalists: Dea Redžić, Ratko Martinović and Marko Petrak. Since then, two more hosts have an various points hosted episodes, the rapper Slaven Berić, better known as Fil Tilen and Aida Šukurica, a journalist and radio host.

By their first anniversary, they had amassed a total of 1,5 million views and 5,500 subscribers to their channel, and had hosted a number notable personalities, such as Mirko Cro Cop, Stipe Drews, Roberto Soldić and Vedran Bađun.

In May 2019, they passed the milestone of 100 million total views, which made them the most listened to podcast in Croatian history. At that point, they had gained over 100,000 subscribes as well.

== Show composition ==
The show currently has three regular hosts: Ratko Martnović and Marko Petrak, who are the co-founders of the podcast, and Milan Stjelja, who is a later addition.

Marko Petrak primarily hosts personalities from the sphere of combat sports and martial arts, most often boxers and mixed martial artists, such as Satoshi Ishii, Antonio Plazibat, Ivana Habazin, and so on. The themes discussed usually relate to the professional careers of the athletes, their latest fights, as well as their opinions on the recent happenings in the world of combat sports.

Ratko Martinović hosts people from various spheres of life, such as the e-sports player Luka Perković, the synth-pop band Svemirko or sportspeople such as Ivica Kostelić.

Milan Stjelja hosts the "A1 Nogometni Podcast" which focuses exclusively on football in Croatia, the guests most often being Football players, managers, coaches, or journalists.
