= Radoslav Lopašić =

Croatian historian (1830-1893)

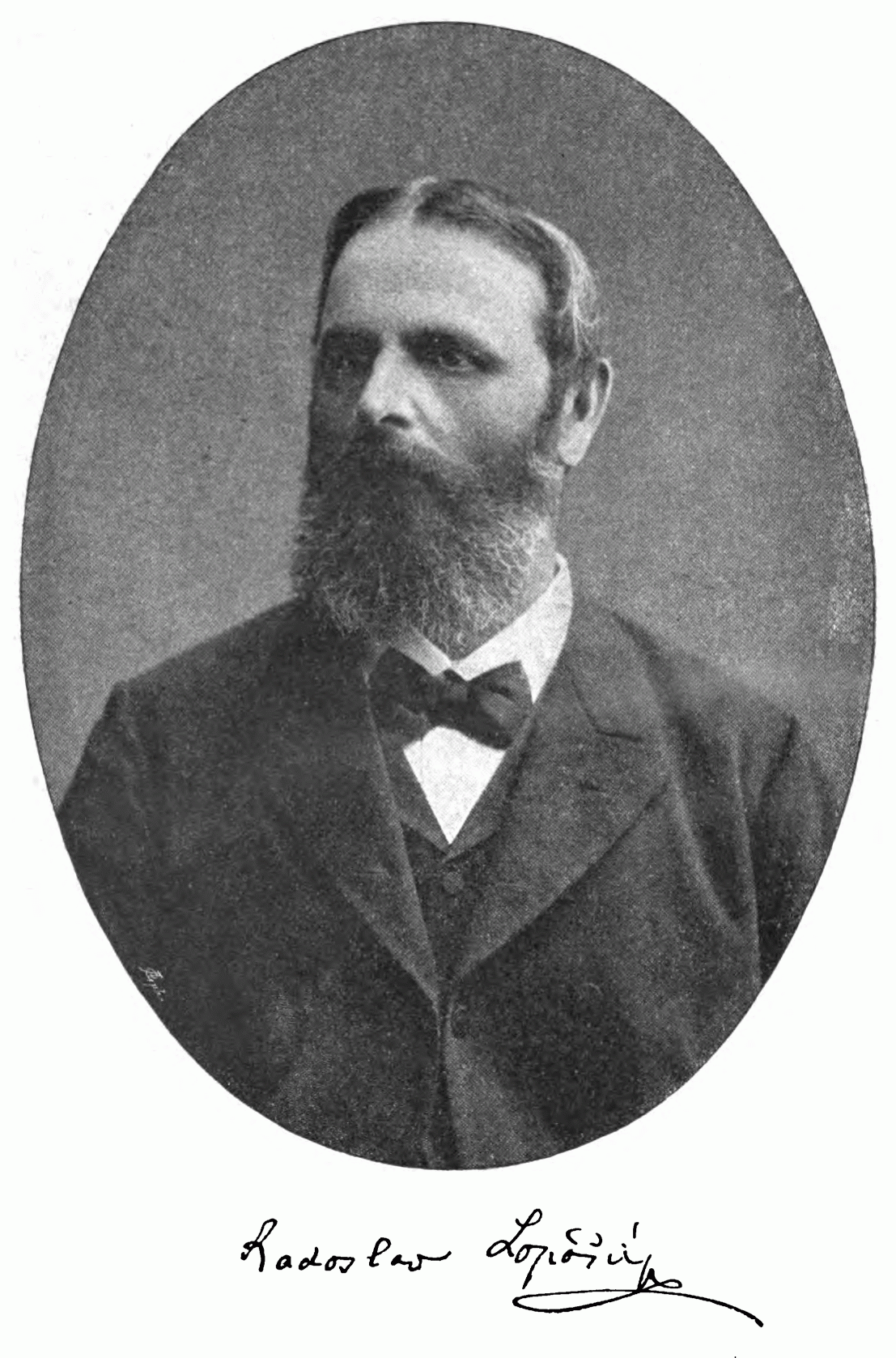
- Radoslav Lopašić: Oko Kupe i Korane. Zagreb 1895, frontispiece with signature
- Born: 20 May 1835; Karlovac, Austrian Empire (modern-day Croatia)
- Died: 25 April 1893 (aged 57); Zagreb, Austria-Hungary (modern-day Croatia)
- Occupation: historian

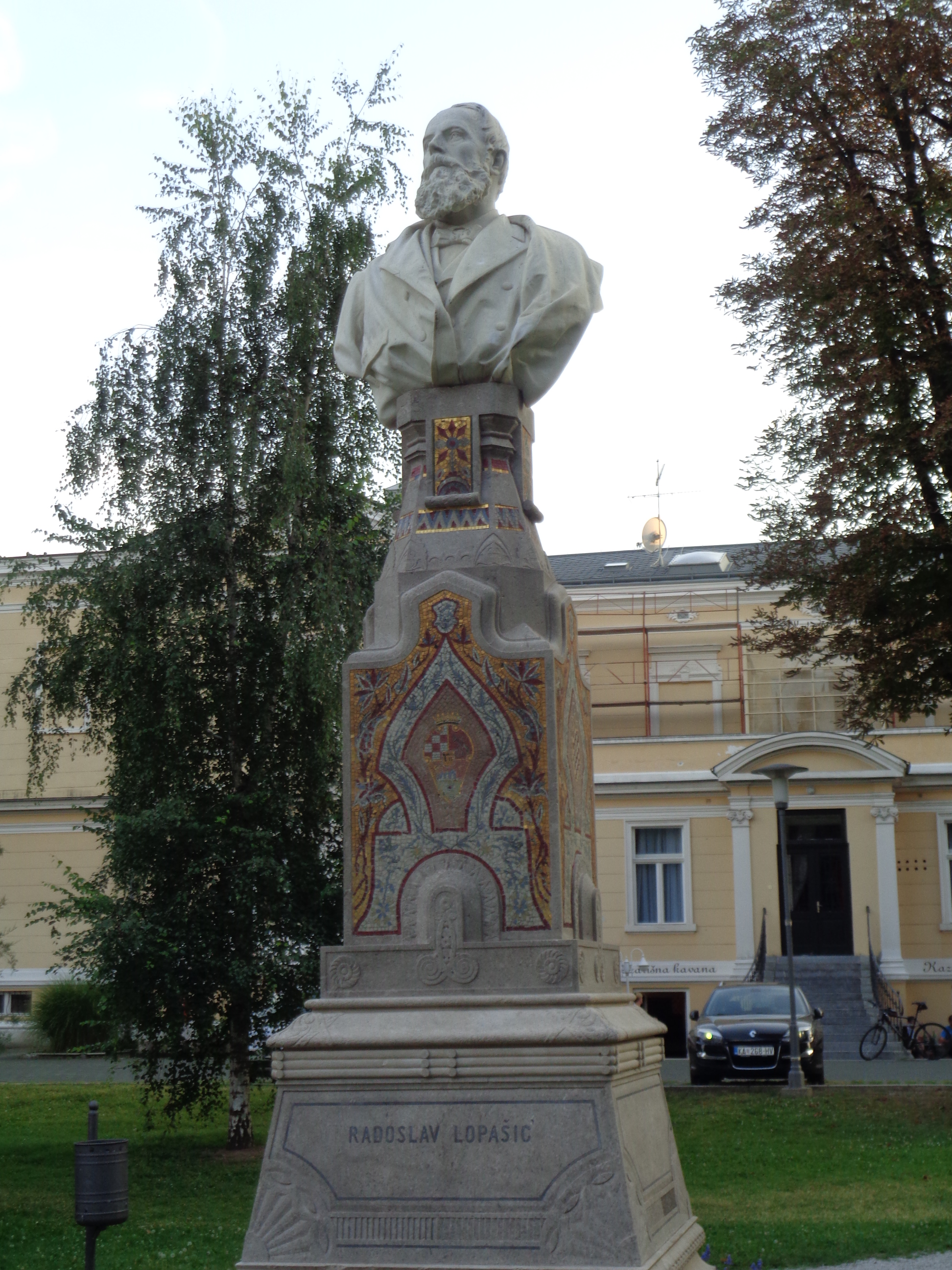
Lopašić bust in Karlovac

Radoslav Lopašić (1830–1893) was a Croatian historian and member of the Yugoslav Academy of Sciences and Arts.

Lopašić was born on 20 May 1830 in Karlovac, Austrian Empire (modern-day Croatia). His father was Mirko Lopašić, at that time a mayor and a city judge, while his mother was Magdalena nee Dobrilović. After being educated in Karlovac and Zagreb, Lopašić began his career in city administration.

== Sources ==
- Lopašić, Radoslav (1989). Dva hrvatska junaka Marko Mesić i Luka Ibrišimović: sa sedam slika. Kršćanska sadašnjost. ISBN 9788639700737.
- Karaman, Igor (1980). Enciklopedija hrvatske povijesti i kulture. Skolska knjiga.
