= Marko Mesić (priest) =

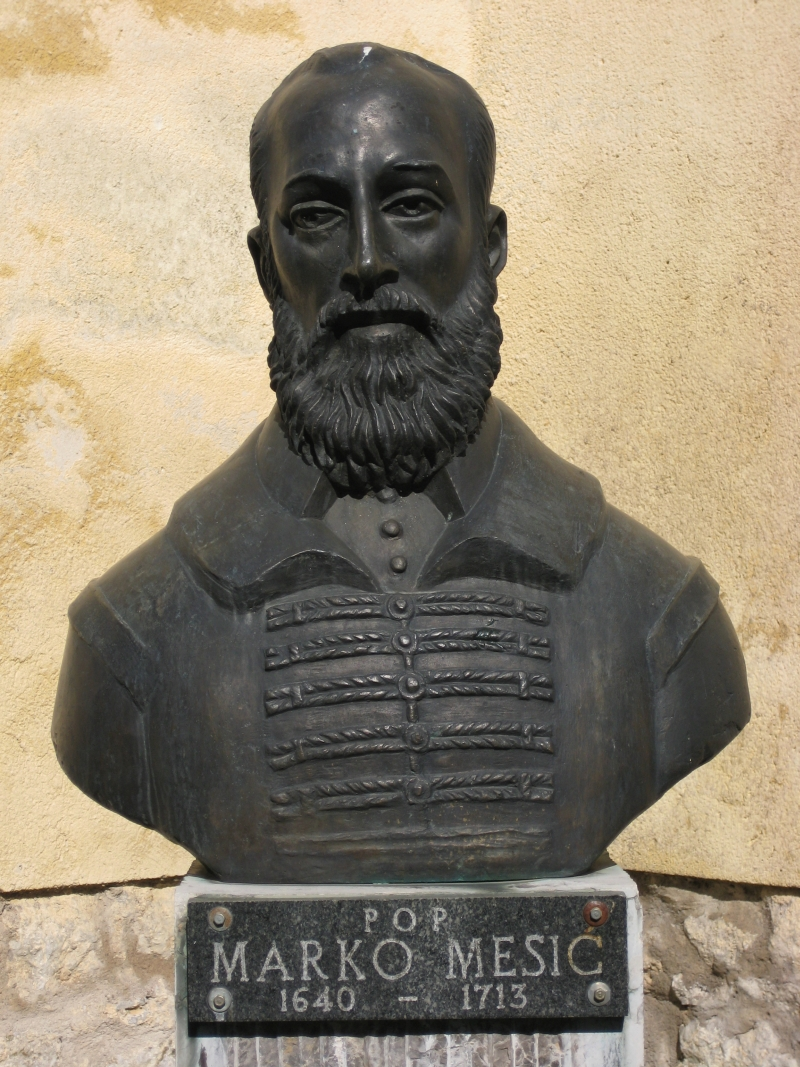
Memorial to Marko Mesić, Brinje, Croatia

Marko Mesić (1640? in Brinje – 2 February 1713 in Karlobag) was a Croatian priest and war hero from the Ottoman wars. Under his command, Croats and Serbs liberated the region of Lika in the 17th century.

== Biography ==
In 1683 when Great Turkish War begun, Marko Mesić went to Ravni Kotari where he joined the local rebels against the Turks. Soon afterwards he went to Krbava and Lika and organize an uprising against the Turks from Brinje. On 15 June 1689 he captured Novi and a number of other villages who surrendered without a fight. Finally, Udbina was liberated on 21 July 1689.

== See also ==
- Luka Ibrišimović
