= Miklós Erdődy =

Croatian ban of Hungarian descent

Miklós Erdődy Nikola III Erdödy

Ban of Croatia
- In office March 1670 – 7 June 1693
- Preceded by: Petar Zrinski
- Succeeded by: Adam II. Batthyány

Personal details
- Born: 1630
- Died: 7 June 1693 (aged 62–63) Aranyosmarót, Kingdom of Hungary
- Resting place: Zagreb Cathedral, Croatia
- Parent(s): Vuk I Erdődy; Barbara Turóczy

Military service
- Battles/wars: Great Turkish War

Miklós Erdődy de Monyorókerék et Monoszló (Croatian: Nikola III Erdödy) (1630 – 7 June 1693) was a Croatian ban of Hungarian descent. He was a member of the Erdődy noble family and a Hungarian count.

He succeeded Petar Zrinski as ban in 1671. In 1684 he began his most notable undertaking, driving Ottoman forces out of Slavonia. Virovitica was liberated from the Ottoman rule in 1684. In 1688 the city of Kostajnica was liberated, and Slavonski Brod was liberated by 1691.

Erdődy died in 1693. However, his work was carried on by his successor Adam II. Batthyány. The wars against the Ottoman Empire throughout the region eventually led to the Treaty of Karlowitz in 1699.

Preceded by Petar Zrinski	Ban of Croatia; 1670–1693	Succeeded by Adam II. Batthyány
