= Holy League (1684) =

Anti-Ottoman alliance formed in 1684 in Europe

Holy League of 1684 Sacra Ligua (Latin)
- 1684–1699
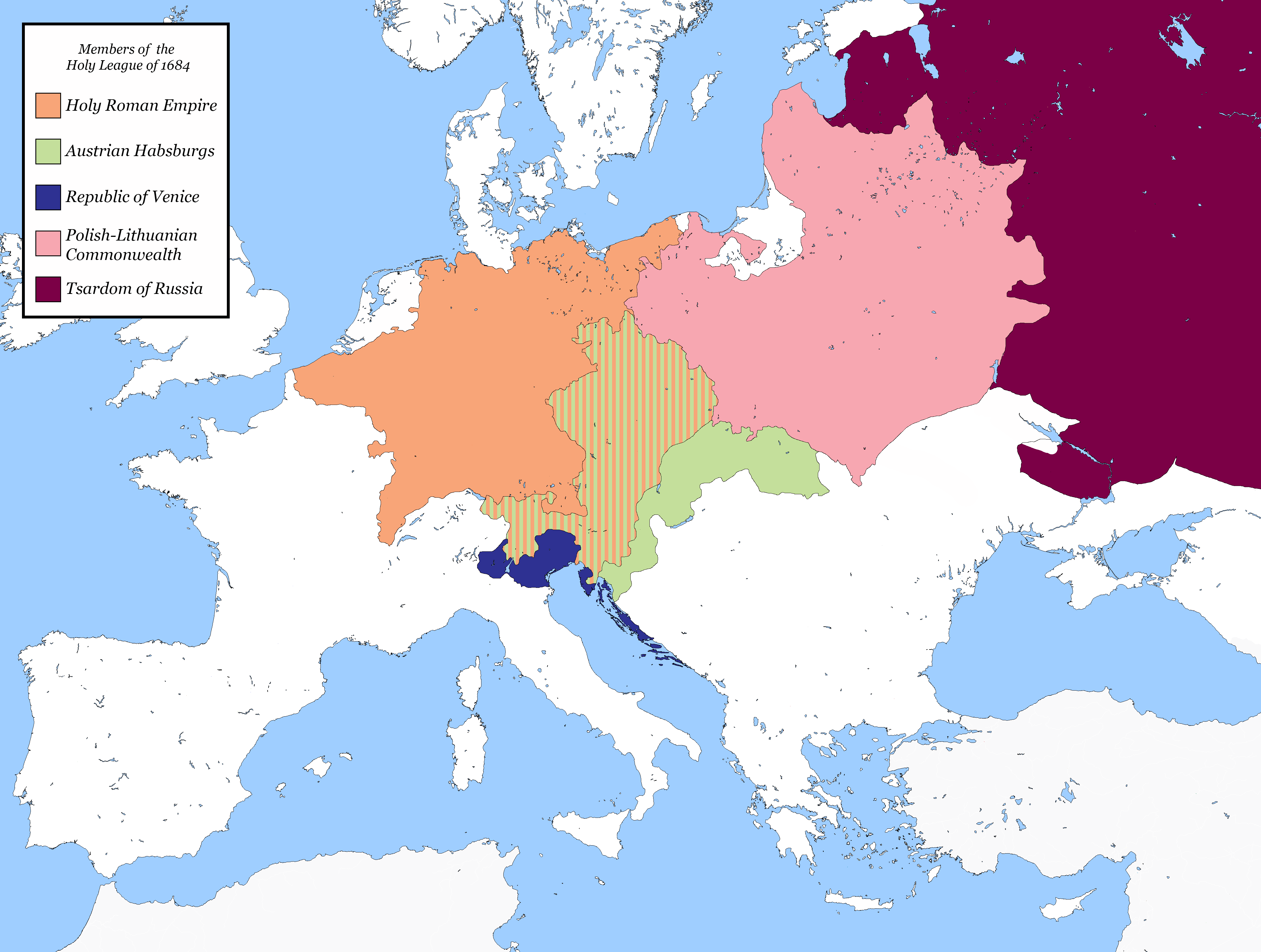
- Members of the Holy League Members of the Holy League: Polish–Lithuanian Commonwealth; Holy Roman Empire/Habsburg monarchy; Venetian Republic; Tsardom of Russia
- Status: Military alliance
- Historical era: Great Turkish War
  - Treaty of Warsaw: 31 March 1683
  - Established: 5 March 1684
  - Russo-Polish Alliance: 26 April 1686
  - Dissolved: 26 January 1699

The Holy League (Latin: Sacra Ligua) was a coalition of Christian European nations formed during the Great Turkish War. Born out of the Treaty of Warsaw, it was founded as a means to prevent further expansion of the Ottoman Empire into Europe. This consolidation of a large portion of Europe's military might led to unprecedented military successes, with large areas of previously ceded land recovered in Morea, Dalmatia and Danubia in what has been dubbed a "14th crusade".

The formation of the League has been recognised as a turning point in the history of the Ottoman Empire. By forcing military defeats and territorial losses onto the Empire, the League shifted the balance of power away from the Ottomans, leading to a diminished Ottoman presence in Europe. The League was dissolved after the Treaty of Karlowitz in 1699.

== Background and origins ==
=== Ottoman imperialism ===
The Ottoman Empire had annexed much of Eastern Europe under sultan Mehmed IV through multiple successful conquests. After Poland's surrender of most of right-bank Ukraine in 1681, the Ottoman Empire bordered with Poland, the Habsburg monarchy, and Russia. They assumed direct control over all of south-eastern Europe, and multiple free states such as Wallachia, Transylvania, and Moldavia had become eyalet vassals of the empire. Crete, Cyprus, and other Mediterranean islands of strategic importance had also been seized from the Venetian Republic.

The culmination of Ottoman advances was the establishment of a military corridor from Constantinople, through Turkish-controlled Morava Valley and Belgrade, to the once-Habsburg fortress Érsekújvar in Royal Hungary. In the wake of this corridor was an inflow of Ottoman culture, including the construction of new schools, hamams ("Turkish baths"), and mosques, in what Geoffrey Treasure has called a "Muslim penetration" into Europe. On the Venetian island of Chios, the Ottomans banned all Roman Catholic worship, converting previous Catholic churches to mosques. Prominent Christian figures at the time such as Pope Innocent XI and Friar Marco d'Aviano saw these advances as a foreign threat to Christianity.

=== Secessionist movements ===
Concurrent to the imperialist threat was a growing secessionist movement in Royal Hungary. Under the rule of Leopold I, the Habsburg monarchy had allowed grievances against the Protestant Church in Hungary to go unpunished, which included the conversion of Protestant churches and the expulsion of their ministers. This Counter-Reformation movement saw the population of Hungary grow increasingly disillusioned with Habsburg rule. This was heightened following the Treaty of Vasvár in 1664, when the Habsburgs refused to pursue retreating Ottoman forces beyond the borders of the Holy Roman Empire, which enabled them to set up a garrison in Hungary. Using an already-established military corridor, Ottoman officials could then pass into Hungary unimpeded, where they demanded tax from the Hungarian wealthy and elite. When the Habsburgs refused to intervene, the Hungarian trust in the Monarchy declined further; the combined effect of declining trust and growing Ottoman presence prompted a conspiracy to secede Hungary to the Ottoman Empire. This culminated in an attempt at communication with the Turkish Grand Vizier, which was only halted by the discovery of the conspiracy and the subsequent execution of the main conspirators, putting pressure on the Habsburgs to push back against the Ottoman presence in their western territory.

=== Treaty of Warsaw ===
Fearing further Ottoman advances into Europe, King John III Sobieski of Poland sought to form an alliance with Leopold I. This was met by immediate controversy in the Polish Diet, where the pro-Ottoman French party held a significant minority. Further negotiations in the Diet led to violence among the senators, with the French party fearing an alliance would see French influence over Poland diminish. These fears were alleviated only slightly by the agreement that the alliance was only to be called upon if Vienna or Kraków were under threat from the Ottomans. It was only through the backing of Pope Innocent XI that the Polish court would eventually sign this Treaty of Warsaw on March 31, 1683. This backing included a papal subsidy of 200,000 imperial thalers to Poland, the mobilisation of 60,000 Holy Roman troops, and the appointment of a Cardinal Protector for Sobieski III.

The alliance was called into effect only six months later when the Ottomans besieged Vienna. Following the end of the siege and the liberation of the city by Polish forces, Sobieski wrote to Pope Innocent XI giving him his “unextinguished zeal in propagating the Christian faith”. Nevertheless, Innocent was wrought with anxiety, fearing that Vienna could not withstand another attack. He believed that without the help of Venice, there was no chance of repelling further Turkish advances. Venice had already voiced their desire to be part of an anti-Turkish alliance and desired to reclaim their Mediterranean territory from the Ottomans. However, an alliance with the Holy Roman Empire was complicated by tensions between the two states as a result of Venetian ambassadors taking advantage of Innocent XI’s goodwill and their privileges in Rome.

== The League ==
=== The Treaty ===
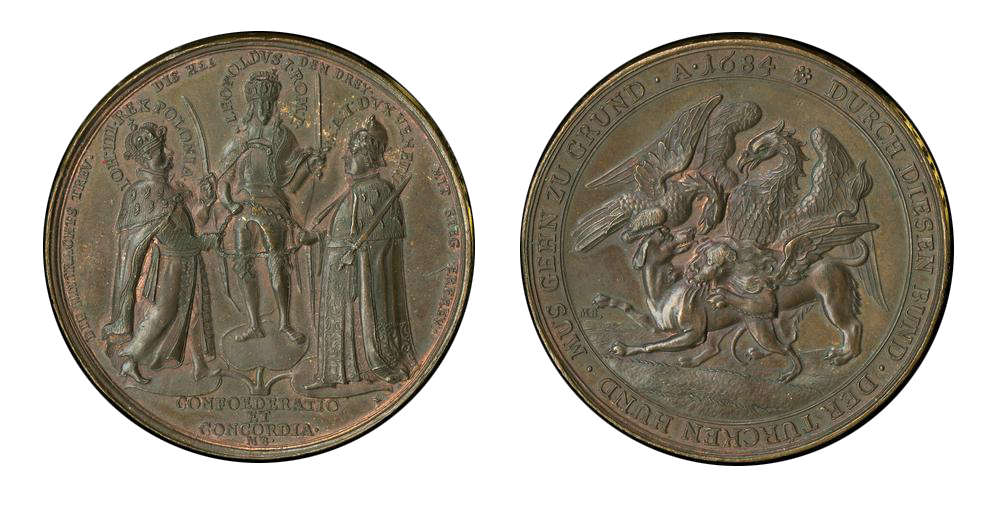
A bronze coin minted to commemorate the formation of the Holy League

Following the desire of Venice to join in an alliance, the Holy League was conceived of by Pope Innocent XI. Modeled after the Treaty of Warsaw, it compelled the members to mobilise their forces against an Ottoman threat exclusively, and to continue their campaigns until all members agreed to make peace. It was signed into effect on 5 March 1684 at Linz by representatives of the Holy Roman Empire under the rule of the Habsburg Monarchy, the Polish-Lithuanian Commonwealth, and the Venetian Republic; all other Christian nations were invited to join as well. It was then sworn in by the Pope and most of the Cardinals of Rome on May 24, where the Pope became patron of the League. According to the alliance,

"In order to impart greater strength to the holy undertaking and to knit together the alliance with indissoluble bonds, the allied Powers choose the Pope and his successors, as the common father of Christendom, for the protector, guarantor and representative of the alliance."

The League stipulated that all members were to act independently, and that they would retain all land that their conquests allowed them. This proved difficult for Venice, who believed that they had insufficient foot troops and so Leopold I would reclaim previously Venetian land in Dalmatia. This prompted an amendment to the League in the days that followed its creation, so that Venice would receive all reconquered land in Dalmatia regardless.

The name "The Holy League" has been called a propaganda term, which highlights the crusade-like nature of the war that the members waged.

=== Russia ===
Negotiations for the Tsardom of Russia to join an alliance began in early 1684, when nuncio of Poland Girolamo Buonvisi had begun to reconcile relations with Russia. Previous territorial wars had concluded in a truce, and the two were yet to formally make peace; Russia also currently had control of previously Polish Kiev, making two barriers which had to be overcome before Russia were to join any alliance.

Innocent XI had similar intentions, sending an envoy to Moscow in April, and in the following month he gifted money to the Cossacks under the pretense that more would be given if Russia were to join the League. These attempts at diplomacy culminated in the Pope’s personal invitation in August to Tsarine Sophia, calling on Russia to join the Holy League; this was eventually accepted on 26 April 1686 after a peace treaty with Poland was made. Russia joined the League on the stipulation that they were to keep Kiev from the Polish in exchange for 1.5 million florins, with the requirement that they were to begin war with the Ottomans before the end of 1686.

=== Opposition ===
Having revived their long-standing alliance with the Ottoman Empire, France had publicly declared that they would refuse to aid in defending against a Turkish invasion. Prior to the Treaty of Warsaw, King Louis XIV exerted control over the Polish diet through a paid French minority, which sought to stall Sobieski III's attempts at joining in an alliance with Leopold I. This was supported by agents throughout Poland, who claimed that the Habsburgs sought Polish help with the intent of regaining Austrian land only. A conspiracy to install a French prince as Polish king was uncovered in 1692, which would have prevented the formation of the League entirely.

King Louis XIV attempted to exert similar control over Leopold I himself, by sowing doubt in his mind over the necessity of the alliance. When this failed and the League went ahead, the Habsburgs were making large territorial gains and expanding their influence further into south-east Europe. In response, France attacked the Habsburg Empire in 1688, attempting to aid the Ottomans by creating a second front while expanding their influence in Europe. (Note: King Louis XIV claimed that in response to his invasion, "the Emperor will be forced to withdraw his troops from Hungary in order to send them to the Rhine and even into Italy".) This Nine Years' War would go on to prolong the Ottoman surrender and cripple the Austrian efforts in the Great Turkish War.

== Non-member allies ==
=== German principalities ===
Multiple German principalities, which Leopold I did not have full control over, had pledged to aid the Holy League. Brandenburg-Prussia, which had typically allied with France and resisted imperial control, pledged 7,000 men and 150,000 imperial thalers to the success of the League in 1685 following extensive negotiations between the Pope and Elector of Brandenburg, Frederick William. Similarly, Bavaria pledged 8,000 men, Cologne 2,900, Franconia 3,000, Swabia 1,400, the Upper Rhine 1,500 and Sweden 1,000 as a guarantor of the imperial constitution.

=== Persia ===
Despite not being a Christian nation, the League had allied with Persia and sought to invite them to join on multiple occasions, seeking to leverage the primarily Shiite Persians' history of opposition to the Sunni Ottomans. The first invitation was during the initial formation of the League in 1683, which the Shah Suleiman of Persia rejected on the grounds that his troops were needed to defend Persia’s borders from Cossack raids. A similar request was made by the Archbishop of Naxivan at the turn of 1684, which was also rejected.

The necessity of Persia to defend her borders from the Cossacks was removed when Russia joined the League, and on 20 July 1686 Innocent XI once more wrote to the Shah to encourage him to join the Holy League. In response, Suleiman prepared 30,000 troops to march against the Ottoman Empire, claiming he “would take advantage of so favourable an opportunity.” He did not bring Persia to join the League, however.

== Diplomatic relations ==
=== With the Ottoman Empire ===
Following the formation of the League, the European powers made large territorial gains, in what has been called a “14th crusade” by von Hammer-Purgstall. The successes prompted the Ottoman Empire to open diplomatic relations in 1688, where an envoy was sent to the Habsburg court, seeking peace. With their advantageous position, the Habsburgs put forward ambitious peace terms, centred around retaining territorial gains and the handover of Hungary's Emeric Thököly, leader of the nation's secessionist movements. Despite six days of negotiations, the envoy was unable to meet both the Sultan’s and Habsburg’s demands, and peace was not reached.

Following this failure and the throning of a new Sultan, the Ottomans redoubled their military efforts and made no more attempts at diplomatic communication with the League for almost a decade. The territorial gains of the League continued, however, and the defeat of the Ottomans at the Battle of Zenta in September 1697 led to immediate calls for peace.

=== Finances ===
Financial issues plagued the members of the League for the first year of its existence, and almost led to its dissolution at this early stage. Soon after its formation, Sobieski III had demanded increasing sums of money from Rome, with the message that they were necessary to further the war efforts that Poland was preparing. When Innocent XI refused, he was informed that Poland were to leave the League if they did not receive the money they demanded. Within a year, Innocent XI had donated over 1.5 million florins to Poland. This was in spite of their refusal to begin conflict with the Ottoman Empire, a fact which annoyed Innocent XI greatly and was enunciated by Cardinal Cibo in his letter, where he states "had these sums been used elsewhere, they would have been a great help, whereas in Poland nothing was done." These issues further strained the relationship between Poland and Rome until the former put their money to use and began conquest against the Ottoman Empire late in 1686.

== Dissolution ==
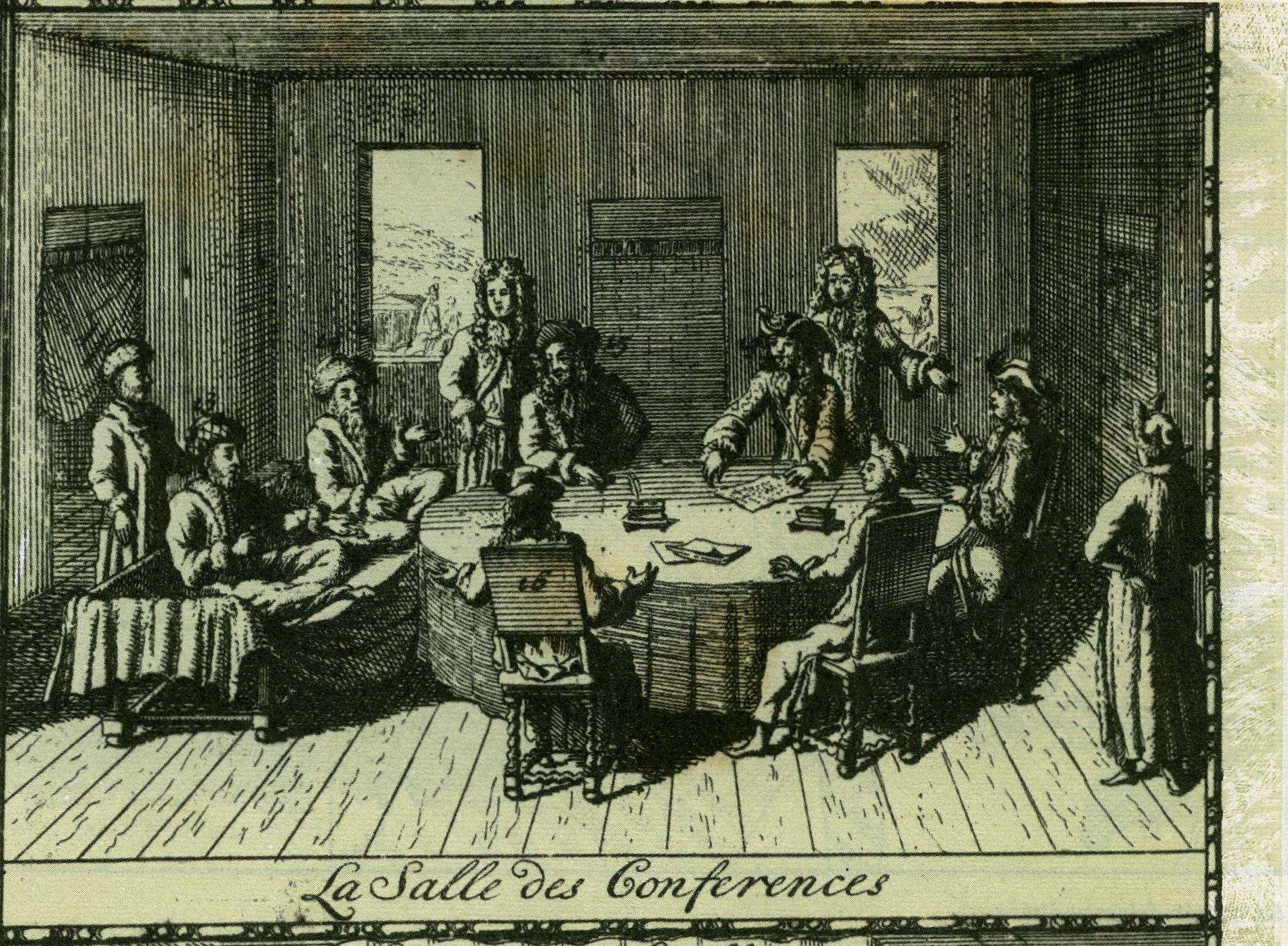
The signing of the Treaty of Karlowitz, which marked the end of the Holy League

Under the terms of the League, it was to be terminated at the end of the war with the Ottomans. When peace was brought forward in 1697, the League was quick to accept and put an end to the war for multiple reasons. The members, especially the Holy Roman Empire, needed to relocate troops to the opposite side of Europe nearing the end of 1698, where the issue of the succession of the Spanish crown loomed; death of the childless Charles II of Spain was imminent and the rest of Europe saw a chance to claim part of Spain for their own. The Venetians were holding onto newly gained territory at a great cost, to which the only end was peace. The death of Sobieski III in 1696 had halted the Polish advances significantly, as had financial issues and a lack of support from the Diet.

Peace was officially made between the founding three members of the Holy League and the Ottoman Empire on January 26, 1699, through the signing of the Treaty of Karlowitz. While Russia would not sign the treaty, and would not agree to a truce for another year, this marked the end of the Ottoman threat to Vienna and Kraków and thus the end of the Holy League.

== Aftermath ==
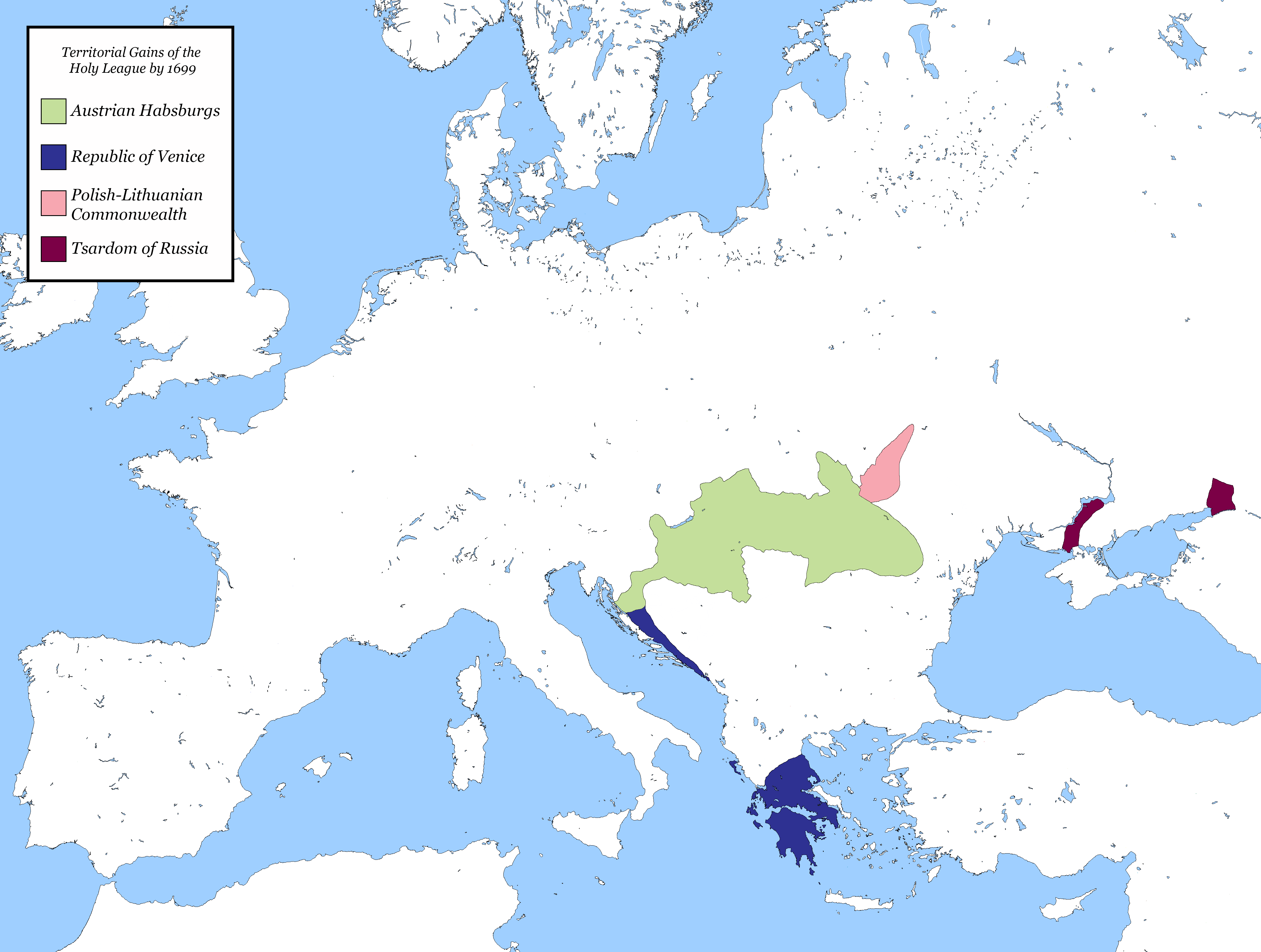
Territory ceded to the Holy League by 1699

The Treaty of Karlowitz guaranteed uti possidetis, meaning the powers of the League were able to retain all conquered land. The Habsburg Empire was able to reclaim Hungary from Thököly's Ottoman control, Venice reclaimed Morea and regions in Dalmatia, Poland regained Podolia and Russia regained parts of Novorossiya as well as Azak.

The willingness of the Ottomans both in 1688 and 1697 to open diplomatic relations represents a major shift in power according to some historians. Yilmaz describes the formation of the Holy League as having “clearly altered the balance between the two Empires to the advantage of the Habsburgs”, which is in contrast to the successes the Ottoman Empire enjoyed in the century prior to its formation. This is echoed by Abou-El-Haj, who notes that the Ottoman Empire had little in the way of formal diplomatic procedures and relied upon continual military victories as foreign relations.

== Sources ==
- Abou-El-Haj, Rifa'at (1967). "Ottoman Diplomacy at Karlowitz". Journal of the American Oriental Society. 87 (4): 498–512. doi:10.2307/597591. JSTOR 597591.
- Ágoston, Gábor; Masters, Bruce (2008). Encyclopedia of the Ottoman Empire. Infobase Publishing. ISBN 978-0816062591.
- Brooks, Viola (1917). The Relations of Turkey and Austria 1683-1699 (Thesis). University of Illinois.
- Dvoichenko-Markov, Demetrius (1990). "Gheorghe Duca Hospodar of Moldavia and Hetman of the Ukraine, 1678-1684". The Institute for Balkan Studies. 31 (1): 73–86.
- Dumont, Jean (1731). Corps universel diplomatique du droit des gens (in Latin).
- Hatton, Ragnhild (1976). Hatton, Ragnhild (ed.). Louis XIV and Europe. Palgrave Macmillan UK. doi:10.1007/978-1-349-15659-7. ISBN 978-1-349-15659-7.
- Hyndman-Rizk, Nelia (2012). Pilgrimage in the Age of Globalisation: Constructions of the Sacred and Secular in Late Modernity. Cambridge Scholars Publishing. ISBN 978-1443839044.
- Sobieski III, John (1683). "Sobieski's letter to Pope Innocent XI" (in Polish). Letter to Pope Innocent XI.
- Lewitter, Lucian (1965). "The Russo-Polish Treaty of 1686 and its Antecedents" (PDF). The Polish Review. 9 (3): 5–29. JSTOR 25776561.
- Michels, Georg (2012). "Ready to Secede to the Ottoman Empire: Habsburg Hungary after the Vasvár Peace Treaty (1664-1674)". Hungarian Cultural Studies. 5: 65–76. doi:10.5195/ahea.2012.69.
- Nolan, Cathal (2008). Wars of the Age of Louis XIV. Greenwood Press. ISBN 978-0313330469.
- Setton, Kenneth (1991). Venice, Austria, and the Turks in the Seventeenth Century. American Philosophical Society. ISBN 978-0-87169-192-7.
- Treasure, Geoffrey (2003). The making of modern Europe 1648—1780. Routledge. ISBN 0-203-42598-7.
- von Pastor, Ludwig (1891). The History of the Popes from the Close of the Middle Ages. Kegan Paul and Co.
- Yilmaz, Yasđr (2009). An Ottoman Peace Attempt at The Habsburg Court During the Ottoman-Holy League War (Thesis). Bilkent University. hdl:11693/14659.
