= Battle of Drava =

Battle of Drava may refer to:

- Battle of the Transdanubian Hills, 1945 World War II operation
- Battle of Drava River (925), medieval conflict
