= Battle of Drava River =

Battle between Ancient Croatia & Hungary

- Part of the Croatian–Hungarian Wars during the Hungarian invasions of Europe
- Scenes of the settlement of Hungarians in the Pannonian Plain - from Chronicon Pictum (14th century)
Date	Unknown (925?)
Location	Right bank of the Drava River, medieval Slavonia (former Principality of Lower Pannonia)
Result	Croatian victory

Belligerents
Duchy of Croatia	Principality of Hungary

Commanders and leaders
Tomislav of Croatia	Zoltán of Hungary

Strength
Unknown	Unknown

Casualties and losses
Unknown	Heavy losses

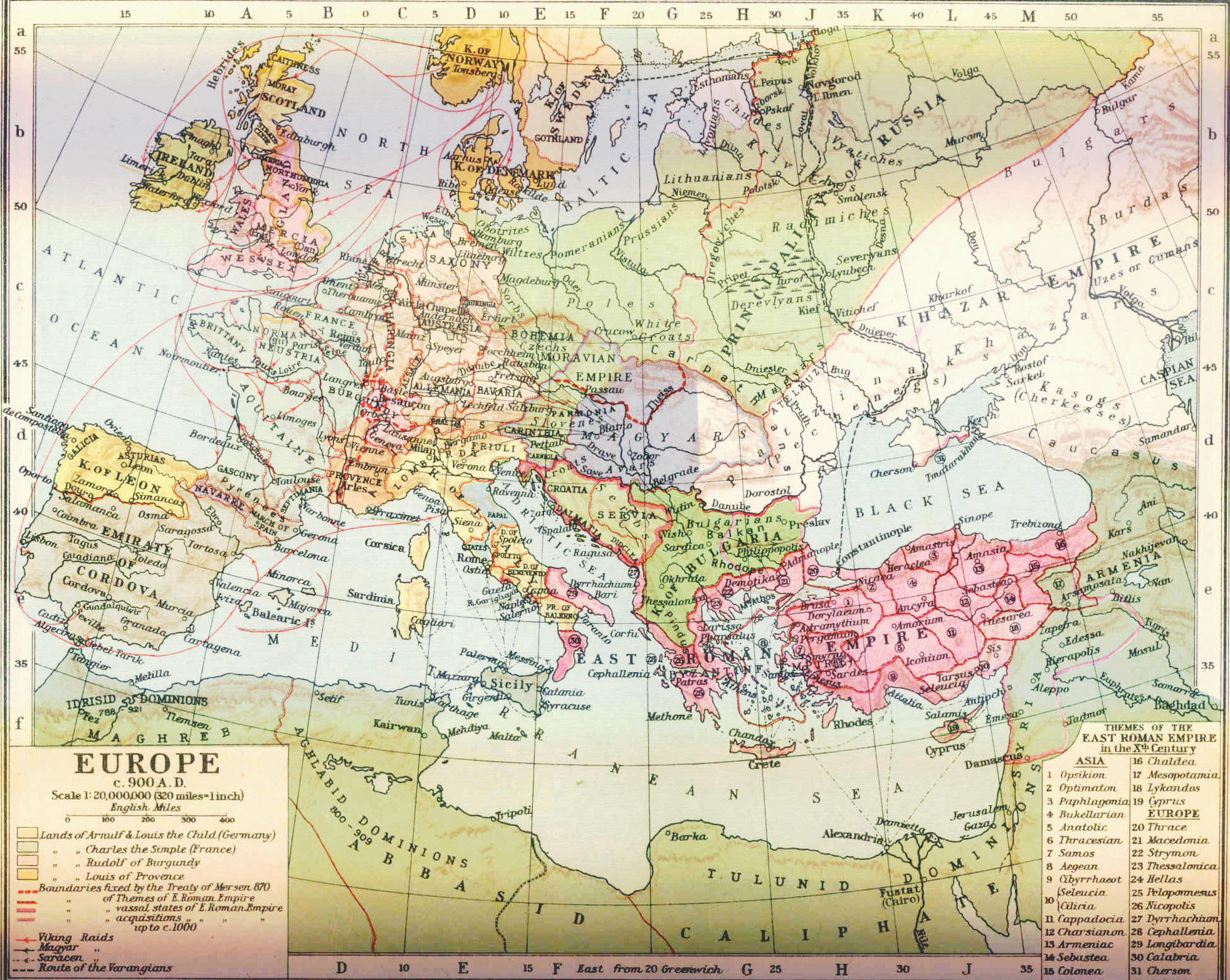
Croatia on the map of Europe around 900.

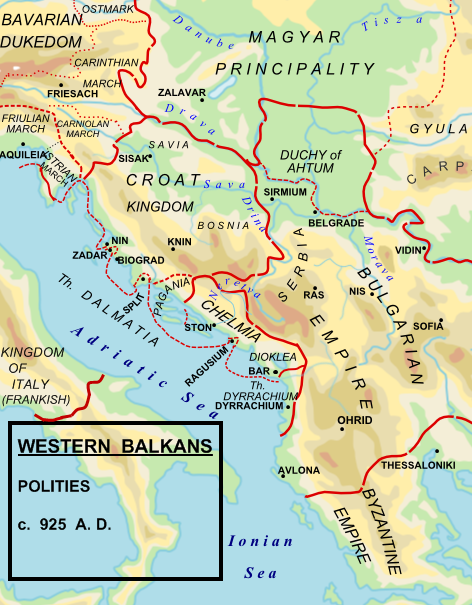
Extended borders of Croatia around 925. after the battle of Drava.

The Battle of Drava River was fought between the army of Tomislav of Croatia and the forces of Hungarian tribes led by Grand Prince Zoltán, the youngest son of Árpád, founder of the Árpád dynasty.

According to the Chronicle of the Priest of Dioclea from the late 12th century, Tomislav of Croatia defeated the Hungarians in battle. Others question the reliability of this account, because it was written almost 300 years after the alleged event, and there is no proof for this interpretation in any other earlier records.

The exact place and time of the battle is not known, but very few remaining medieval sources suggest that the clash took place on the right bank of the Drava River in medieval Slavonia (Latin: Sclavonia) or former Principality of Pannonian Croatia respectively, in 925. Slavonia should have been an integral part of the medieval Croatian state if the battle had happened, however according to the Byzantine ruler Constantine Porphyrogenitus it was under Hungarian control.

The battle was followed by the unification of Duchy of Croatia and the territory of Lower Pannonia.

== Background, battle and consequences ==
Having arrived in the Pannonian Plain by the end of the 9th century and conquering the people living north of the Drava River, Hungarians intensified their fast looting raids across continental Europe. They started occasionally to perform devastating raids and military campaigns to the south as well, across the Drava river, to the territory of the Principality of Pannonian Croatia. They succeeded in defeating the Principality's last known ruler Braslav (ruled in 880–898/900), who was vassalaged to the Kingdom of East Francia. Somewhere at the beginning of the 10th century, Hungarians went further south and attacked the Duchy of Croatia, then ruled by Muncimir (892–910) and his successor Tomislav (910–928), two Knezes (Princes or Dukes) from the House of Trpimirović.

Tomislav undertook measures to prevent Hungarian incursions, mobilizing his army, deploying to the north and carrying out the military actions to fight the enemy. According to meager medieval sources, the decisive battle took place in an undefined area of the right, southern bank of the Drava River. Historians have come to such conclusion on the basis of the following sources: Chronicle of the Priest of Dioclea from the 12th century (Chapter XII: „... King Tomislav, brave young man and powerful warrior, ... fought many wars with the Hungarian king and always forced him to flee...“), De Administrando Imperio from the 10th century, Gesta Hungarorum from the 12th century and Historia Salonitana from the 13th century.

There are no contemporary accounts of the battle. In „De Administrando Imperio“, written a few decades after the battle by Byzantine Emperor Constantine VII Porphyrogenitus, there are more data about another battle Tomislav of Croatia fought, the Battle of the Bosnian Highlands, against the army of the mighty Bulgarian Empire in 927, which resulted in Croatian decisive victory. Together with Constantine's assertion that Tomislav was able to field an army of 100,000 foot soldiers and 60,000 horse soldiers (which numbers are disputed though), it shows, however, the strength and capability of the Croatian army, able to resist the Hungarians. According to the palaeographic analysis of the original manuscript of DAI, the assumed number of inhabitants in medieval Croatia estimated between 440,000 and 880,000 people, and the total number of soldiers on the territory of early medieval great powers - like the Empire of Charlemagne and the Byzantines - were estimated only around 20,000-100,000 infantrymen, and 3,000-24,000 horsemen organized in 60 allagions.

After the battle, Tomislav took control over the territory south of Drava, uniting Croatian lands from the Adriatic Sea in the south to the Drava River in the north, as well as from eastern part of Istria (Raša River) in the west to Drina River in the east. Moreover, the Croatian ruler governed the coastal towns of Byzantine Province of Dalmatia, which he was given by the Emperor.

The records of the two Synods of Bishops held in Split in 925 and 928 indirectly confirm that Croatia comprised the territory of medieval Slavonia, with its capital Sisak. At the 925 Synod Gregory of Nin lost his diocese and was offered to choose another one, among the temporary vacant bishop seats of Skradin, Sisak or Delmit (possibly Delminium - present-day Tomislavgrad, maybe Omiš). Just the possibility to choose Sisak, the only bishopric in Slavonia at that time and the seat of the ruler of Principality of Lower Pannonia, confirms that the area of this former principality was after the battle of Drava controlled by King Tomislav of Croatia.

== Gallery ==
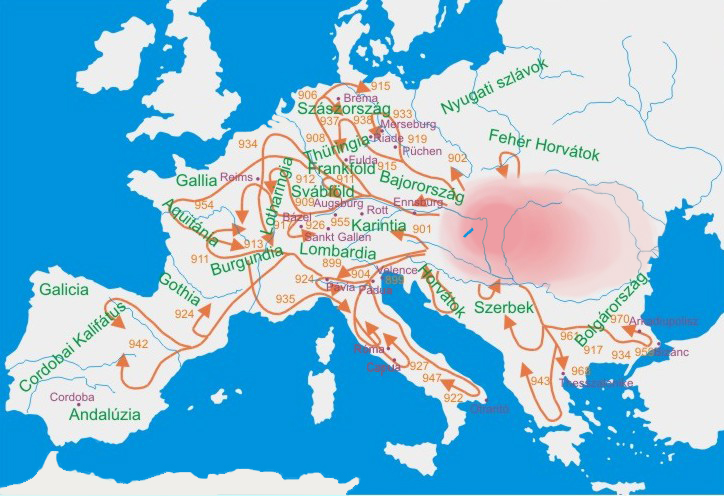
Hungarian campaigns in Europe (Horvátok=Croats)

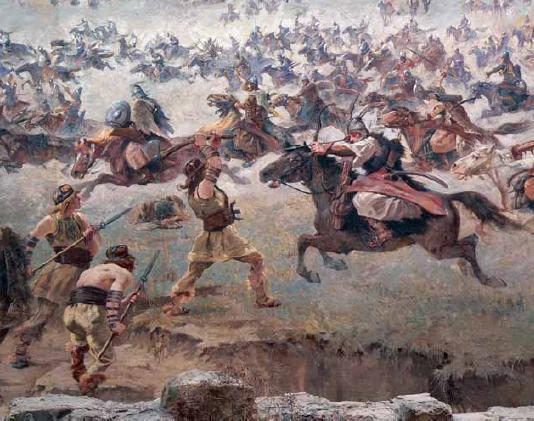
Hungarian warriors attacking

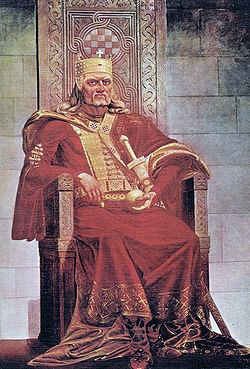
King Tomislav of Croatia defeated Hungarians

== See also ==
- Hungarian invasions of Europe
- Military history of Croatia
- Medieval Croatian state
- Principality of Hungary
