= Siege of Varaždin (1527) =

Siege in the Kingdom of Croatia

- Part of Hungarian campaign of 1527–1528
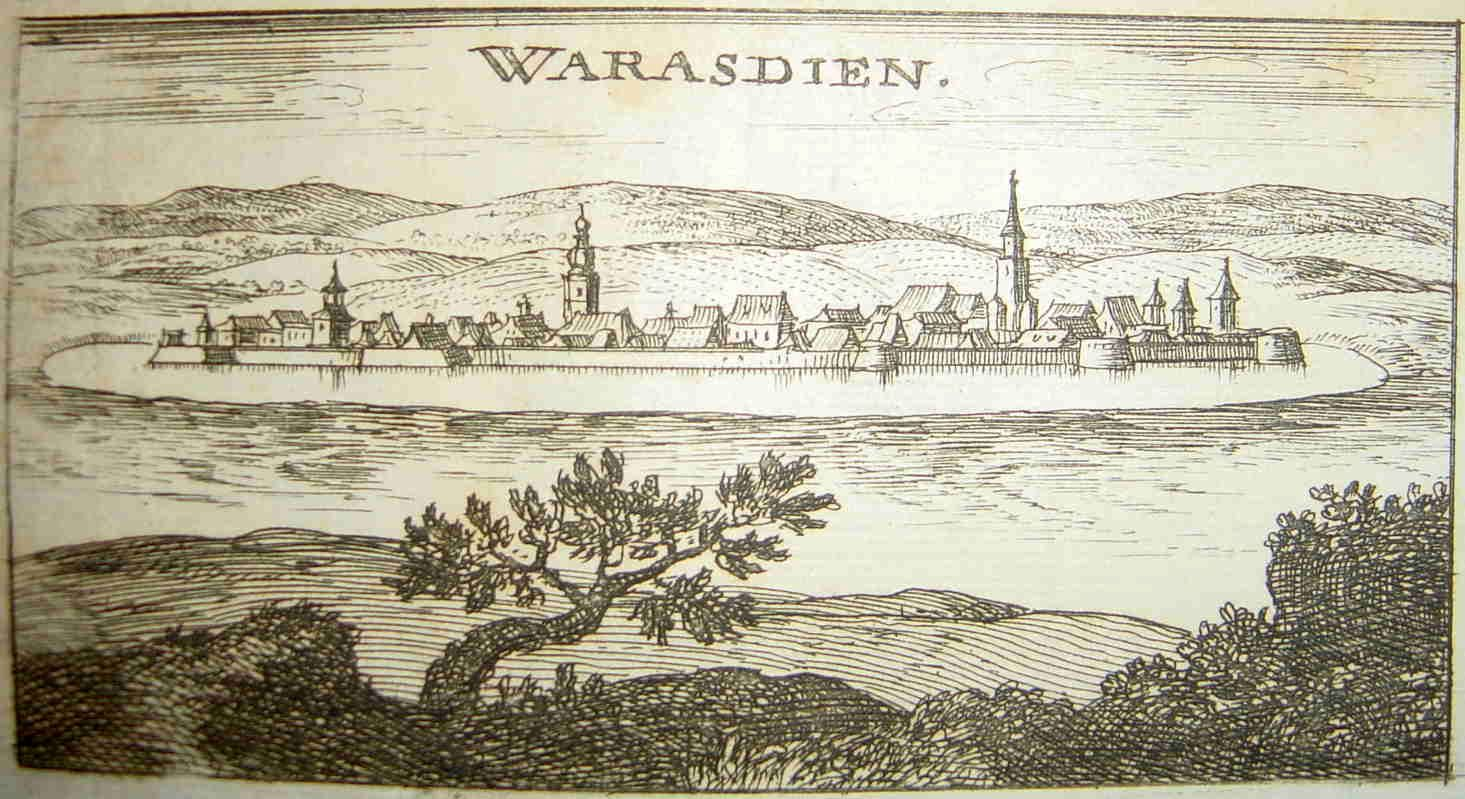
- Varaždin in late 17th century
Date	27 September 1527
Location	Varaždin, Kingdom of Croatia
Result	Withdrawal of Frankopan's army

Belligerents
Habsburg supporters	Zapolya's supporters

Commanders and leaders
Pavao Kečkeš	Christoph Frankopan (DOW)

Strength
Unknown	10,000 Infantry; 3,000 Cavalry

Casualties and losses
Unknown	At least one

The siege of Varaždin was a siege in the Kingdom of Croatia. The war came as a result of Croatian, Slavonian and Hungarian noble diets electing different candidates for their kings, following the death of Louis II of Hungary at Battle of Mohacs.

== Background ==
Following the death of Louis II at the Battle of Mohacs, Croatian nobles gathered at Cetingrad in early 1527 in order to discuss the election of a new king. Their choice was the powerful Ferdinand I of Habsburg, whom Croats wanted to get more thoroughly engaged in their defensive efforts against expanding Ottoman Empire. In another part of the Kingdom, Hungarian nobles elected their own candidate – John Zapolya at their own noble diet in Szekesfehervar in late 1526. The same candidate was also elected on Slavonian noble diet, which happened in Dubrava, near Čazma, Croatia, under the influence of Simon Erdody, the bishop of Zagreb and count Cristoph Frankopan, the only Croatian noble who didn't attended the Cetingrad diet. This effectively brought the kingdom into a state of civil war between supporters of the opposing kings.

=== Ferdinand's campaign in Hungary ===
Ferdinand launched his campaign from Vienna as his 20,000-strong army marched into Hungary. Habsburg commanders soon successfully captured the towns of Győr, Komárom, Esztergom, Visegrád and Buda, while Zapolya's forces retreated towards river Tisza. They were nevertheless intercepted by Habsburg forces near Tarcal in Hungary, where Habsburg general Nicholas, Count of Salm decisively defeated them in the Battle of Tarcal. John Zapolya therefore invited his supporter, ban Cristoph Frankopan, to come to his aid.

== Siege of Varaždin ==
Frankopan assembled his 13,000-strong army near Križevci, which according to Croatian historian Rudolf Horvat consisted of 10,000 infantry and 3,000 cavalry. On the morning of September 24, Frankopan's army was approached by apparent emissaries from Varaždin, who declared their allegiance to him and handed him the town keys, however, once he actually came to Varaždin the town garrison turned out to be pro-Habsburg. Frankopan's commanders then ordered their troops to start digging trenches around town and prepare their siege engines. As he was scouting for weakpoints in town walls, a defending cannon opened fire and one of the missiles gravely wounded Frankopan. The wound was apparently so bad that his guts could be seen, hence his doctors gave up all efforts of even trying to save him. Dying Frankopan issued orders to carry on with the siege, however majority of the army he assembled began dispersing irretrievably. A handful of soldiers that remained by him, started carrying him to Koprivnica, however, he succumbed to his wounds upon reaching Martijanec. His death was a major blow for Zapolya's side, as they lost a powerful supporter in Croatia.
