= Battle of Mohács =

1526 battle of the Ottoman–Hungarian Wars

Coordinates: 45°56′29″N 18°38′50″E

- Part of the Ottoman wars in Europe and the Hungarian–Ottoman Wars
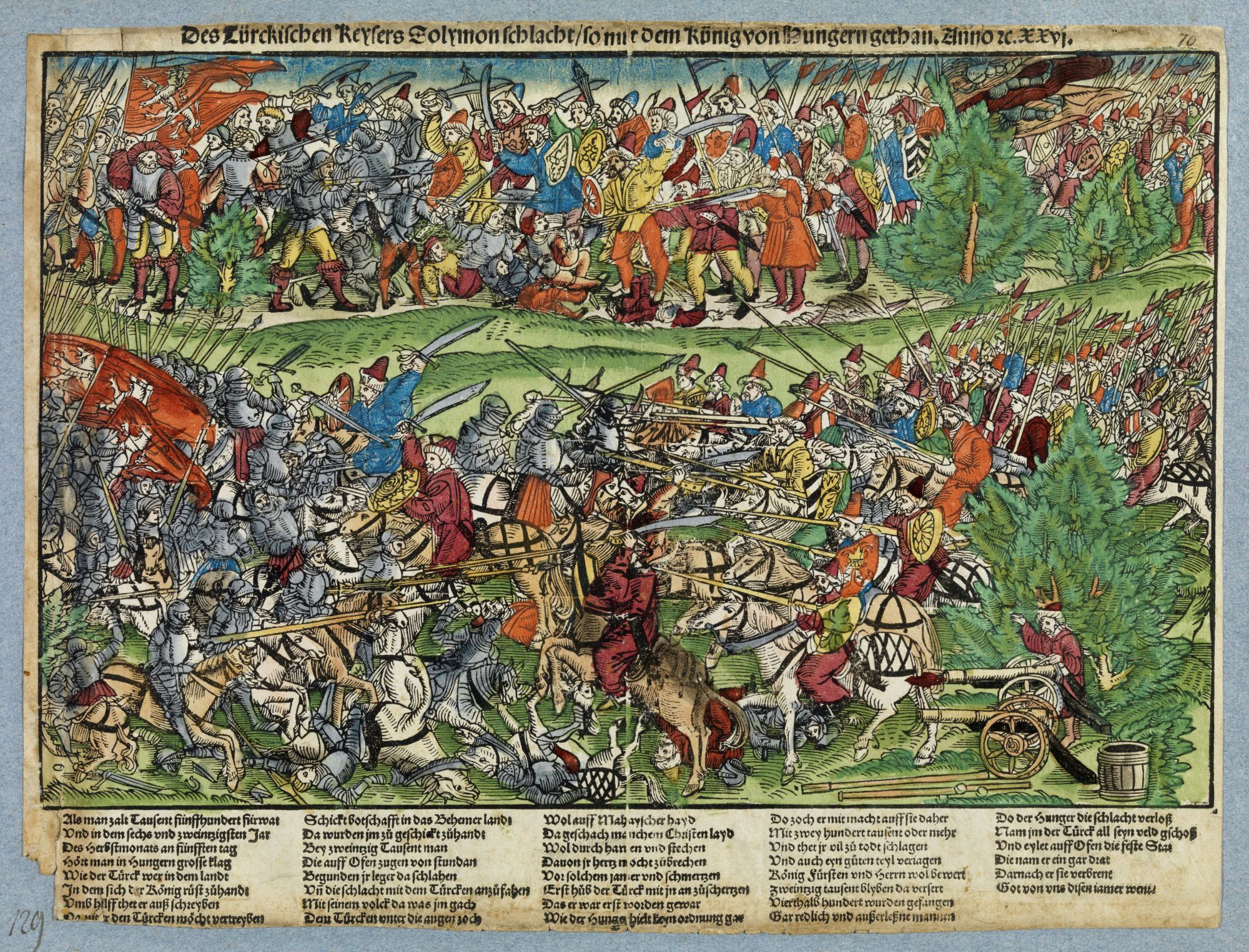
- The Battle of Mohács, coloured woodcut, 1526
Date	29 August 1526
Location	Mohács, Kingdom of Hungary
Result	Ottoman victory

Belligerents
Ottoman Empire	Kingdom of Hungary Supported by: Serbian Despotate; Lands of the Bohemian Crown; Holy Roman Empire; Papal States; Hungarian Slovenes; Crown of the Kingdom of Poland

Commanders and leaders
Suleiman I Pargalı Ibrahim Pasha; Malkoçoğlu Balı Bey; Gazi Husrev-beg; Behram Pasha	Louis II †; Pál Tomori †; György Zápolya †; Ferenc Batthyány; Péter Perényi

Strength
50,000–100,000 men 300 cannons	25,000–30,000 men (on battlefield); Up to 40,000 mobilised 85 cannons (50 arrived in time)

Casualties and losses
1,500–2,000 killed	14,000 – 24,000 killed 10,000 captured 2,000 prisoners executed
- 25,000 Hungarian civilians massacred

The Battle of Mohács took place on 29 August 1526 near Mohács, in the Kingdom of Hungary. It was fought between the forces of Hungary, led by King Louis II, and the invading Ottoman Empire, commanded by Suleiman the Magnificent and his grand vizier, Pargalı Ibrahim Pasha. The Ottomans achieved a decisive victory through superior planning, firepower, and a well-executed encirclement that overwhelmed the Hungarian forces.

The Hungarian army, encouraged by the nobility to engage prematurely, launched a frontal assault that collapsed under coordinated Ottoman counterattacks. King Louis and much of the Hungarian aristocracy were killed, resulting in the destruction of the royal army and the end of the Jagiellonian dynasty in Hungary and Bohemia. The aftermath saw the partition of Hungary between the Ottoman Empire, the Habsburg monarchy, and the Eastern Hungarian Kingdom in 1541.

The battle marked the beginning of sustained Ottoman–Habsburg wars and the decline of Hungary as an independent power. In Hungarian historical memory, Mohács remains a national tragedy, symbolised by the saying “More was lost at Mohács”.

== Background ==
=== Decline of the royal power in Hungary (1490–1526) ===
After the death of the absolutist King Matthias Corvinus in 1490, the Hungarian magnates, who did not want another heavy-handed king, procured the accession of the notoriously weak-willed King Vladislaus of Bohemia, who reigned as King Vladislaus II of Hungary from 1490 to 1516. He was known as King Dobře (or Dobzse in Hungarian orthography), meaning "all right", for his habit of accepting, without question, every petition and document laid before him. The freshly-elected King Vladislaus II donated most of the Hungarian royal estates, régales, and royalties to the nobility. Thus the king tried to stabilize his new reign and preserve his popularity among the magnates.

Given the naive fiscal and land policy of the royal court, the central power began to experience severe financial difficulties, largely due to the enlargement of feudal lands at royal expense. The noble estate of the parliament succeeded in reducing their tax burden by 70–80%, at the expense of the country's ability to defend itself. Vladislaus became the magnates' helpless "prisoner"; he could make no decision without their consent.

Europe's largest standing mercenary army (the Black Army) of Matthias Corvinus was dissolved by the aristocracy. The magnates also dismantled the national administration systems and bureaucracy throughout the country. The country's defenses sagged as border-guards and castle garrisons went unpaid, fortresses fell into disrepair, and initiatives to increase taxes to reinforce defenses were stifled. Hungary's international role declined, its political stability shaken; social progress was deadlocked. The arrival of Protestantism further worsened internal relations in the country.

In 1514, the weakened and old King Vladislaus II faced a major peasant rebellion led by György Dózsa, which was ruthlessly crushed by the nobles, led by John Zápolya. After the Dózsa Rebellion, the brutal suppression of the peasants greatly aided the 1526 Turkish invasion as the Hungarians were no longer a politically united people. The resulting degradation of order paved the way for Ottoman pre-eminence.

=== Jagiellonian-Habsburg attempt to organize defence against the Ottomans ===
King Louis II of Hungary married Mary of Habsburg in 1522. The Ottomans saw this Jagiellonian–Habsburg marital alliance as a threat to their power in the Balkans and worked to break it. After Suleiman I came to power in Constantinople in 1520, the High Porte made the Hungarians at least one and possibly two offers of peace. For unclear reasons, Louis refused. It is possible that Louis was well aware of Hungary's situation (especially after the Ottomans defeated Persia in the Battle of Chaldiran (1514) and the Polish-Ottoman peace from 1525) and believed that war was a better option than peace. Even in peacetime, the Ottomans raided Hungarian lands and conquered small territories (with border castles), but a final battle still offered Louis a glimmer of hope. Accordingly, another Ottoman–Hungarian war ensued, and in June 1526 an Ottoman expedition advanced up the Danube.

In the early 1500s, Vladislav II (ruled 1490–1516), Louis II and Croatian nobles repeatedly asked Holy Roman Emperor Maximilian I for help, but during Maximilian's reign, assistance for Hungary remained only theoretical. After the first chain of fortresses fell however, assessing the threat to his own provinces, Archduke Ferdinand (later Holy Roman Emperor Ferdinand I) made a significant effort to help his brother-in-law. When Nándorfehérvár was being besieged, he summoned his estates and proposed sending troops to Hungary. In the end, 2,000 German infantry troops were sent. From 1522 to the 1526 defeat at Mohács, field troops from Austria frequently arrived but were not placed into fortresses at the border as regular garrisons yet. Even though this military aid purportedly strengthened this area of the border, it had the undesired effect of dissolving the unified leadership that the ban had held until that time.

Alfred Kohler opines that the coordination effort attempted by Ferdinand, Mary and Louis failed because the young Hungarian king showed a lack of vigour, which was also recognized by Hungarian nobles. Mary, on the other hand, was much more decisive and vigorous, but the non-Hungarian advisors she relied on created distrust.

=== The loss of Belgrade ===
The Hungarians had long opposed Ottoman expansion in southeastern Europe, but in 1521 the Turks advanced up the Danube River and took Nándorfehérvár (present-day Belgrade, Serbia) – the strongest Hungarian fortress on the Danube – and Szabács (now Šabac, Serbia). This left most of southern Hungary indefensible.

The loss of Nándorfehérvár caused great alarm in Hungary.

On 18 October 1523, the Hungarian aristocrats united for the recapture of Belgrade, pledging funds that would support an army of 60,000 troops and 100 cannons—an undertaking that was an unprecedentedly huge and costly military force by contemporary European standards. Even the papal legate, by the end of January 1524, denied the disbursement of the aid funds he had brought, arguing that: "if the Hungarians were capable of assembling such an enormous force, then they had no need for the money."

The huge 60,000-strong royal army – led by the king, but recruited too late and too slowly – neglected to take food along and bad organization of logistics. Therefore, the army disbanded spontaneously under pressure from hunger and disease without even trying to recapture Belgrade from the newly installed Turkish garrisons. In 1523, Archbishop Pál Tomori, a valiant priest-soldier, was made captain of Southern Hungary.

=== European events, and the Franco-Ottoman alliance ===
In Europe, especially in Germany, negative trends had started to unfold. The Fuggers, who had taken control of the finances, "by around 1503 had a veritable monopoly of 'favoritism' in Germany, Hungary, Poland and Scandinavia, to the extent that any priest who wanted to get access to even the most modest parish had to turn to the merchants of Augsburg."

The Fugger family controlled the distribution of the Roman Catholic Church's indulgences, which, among other reasons, soon led to an international scandal and then to strong social unrest. After 1517, European public opinion became increasingly preoccupied and divided by the Reformation launched by Martin Luther. The religious upheaval was compounded by the German Peasants' War of 1524–25, which mobilised considerable forces and, in addition to the material damage, caused more than 100,000 deaths.

Between 1521 and 1526, the Western European powers were preoccupied with the current episode of the Italian wars (which were fought on and off for more than 60 years, from 1494 to 1559). France first sought allies in Eastern Europe against Holy Roman Emperor Charles V. French envoy Antonio Rincon visited Poland and Hungary several times between 1522 and 1525. After the Battle of Bicocca (1522), King Francis I of France tried – unsuccessfully – to ally himself with King Sigismund I of Poland. The Hungarian royal court also rejected the French offer. However, John Zápolya, the Voivode of Transylvania, showed a willingness to cooperate with the French, although the formal treaty was not signed until 1528.

King Francis I of France was defeated at the Battle of Pavia on 24 February 1525 by the troops of the Habsburg Holy Roman Emperor, Charles V. After several months in prison, Francis I was forced to sign the Treaty of Madrid.

In a watershed moment in European diplomacy, Francis formed a formal Franco-Ottoman alliance with Sultan Suleiman the Magnificent as an ally against Charles V. The French-Ottoman strategic, and sometimes tactical, alliance lasted for about three centuries.

To relieve the Habsburg pressure on France, in 1525 Francis asked Suleiman to make war on the Holy Roman Empire, and the road from Turkey to the Holy Roman Empire led across Hungary. The request of the French king coincided well with the ambitions of Suleiman in Europe and gave him an incentive to attack Hungary in 1526, leading to the Battle of Mohács.

At the news of the war, the young King Louis II of Hungary appealed to the European princes for help, but only King Henry VIII of England offered aid (which arrived only in 1527 to Queen Mary of Hungary in Pozsony) and the Pope offered 50,000 gold pieces, while neither Charles V nor Ferdinand Habsburg (Archduke of Austria, the Hungarian king's brother-in-law) did anything. The fact was that the Habsburgs' armies were still on the battlefields of Italy.

== Preparation for Mohács ==
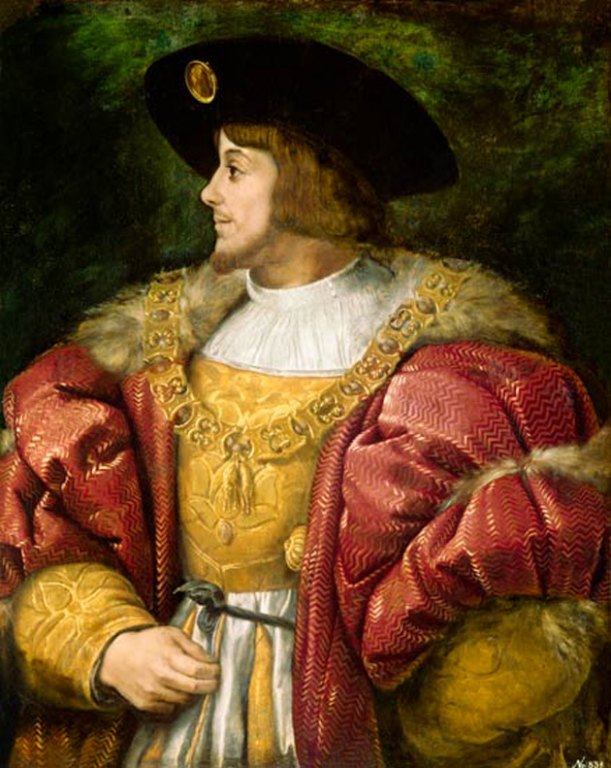
Louis II of Hungary, who died at the Battle of Mohács, painted by Titian

The general apathy that had characterized the country forced Tomori to lean on his own bishopric revenues when he started to repair and reinforce the second line of Hungary's border defense system. (Pétervárad would fall to the Turks on 15 July 1526, due to the chronic lack of castle garrisons.) Three years later, an Ottoman army set out from Constantinople on 16 April 1526, led by Suleiman the Magnificent personally. The Danube River was an extremely important transport route for the Ottoman army in the region, so it was clear to everyone that the Ottoman army would follow the line of the Danube. For about 400 km (250 mi) along the banks of the Danube between Pétervárad and Buda there was not a single Hungarian fortification, town, or even a village of any sort.

The Hungarian nobles, who still did not realize the magnitude of the approaching danger, did not immediately heed their king's call for troops. Eventually, the Hungarians assembled in three main units: the Transylvanian army under John Zápolya, charged with guarding the passes in the Transylvanian Alps, with between 8,000 and 13,000 men; the main army, led by Louis himself (beside numerous Spanish, German, Czech, and Serbian mercenaries); and another smaller force, commanded by the Croatian count Christoph Frankopan, numbering around 5,000 men. The Ottomans deployed the largest field artillery of the era, comprising some 300 cannons, while the Hungarians had only 85 cannons, though even this number was greater than other contemporary Western European armies deployed on the battlefields during the major conflicts of Western European powers.

The number of regular professional paid soldiers (Kapıkulu) employed by the High Porte throughout the Ottoman Empire did not exceed 15,000–16,000 men in the first third of the 16th century. During this time Suleiman could raise an army between 50,000–60,000 for campaigns.

The Ottomans obtained most of the arquebuses for their janissary army from Hungarian and Venetian gunsmiths. This phenomenon was so widespread and severe, that in 1525 the Hungarian Parliament had to pass a law against the export of Hungarian-made arquebuses for the Ottoman Empire.

Contrary to popular belief, the Hungarian infantry was so well equipped with arquebuses that, it had an unusually high firepower in a comparison with contemporary Western European standards. Both armies faced a tactical challenge, namely that they could not move their firepower very well. As a result, they were only able to use it effectively if they fired from a defensive position. The question was who could force the other to start the attack on the battlefield, that is, to attack positions that could then be defended with cannons and arquebuses.

The currently known division of the Hungarian army by arms includes: 3,000 armoured knights from the Hungarian noble banderiums, the king's bodyguard (1,000 armoured knights), 4,500 light cavalry (mainly hussars of Serbian origin), 6,700 mainly Hungarian infantry, 5,300 papal infantry (mainly German Landsknechte, but Italian and Spanish contingents were also represented in smaller numbers) and 1,500 Polish infantry, with an unknown number of artillerymen. Available data do not allow a detailed reconstruction of the rest of the army.

The geography of the area meant that the Hungarians could not know the Ottomans' ultimate goal until the latter crossed the Balkan Mountains, and when they did, the Transylvanian and Croatian forces were farther from Buda than the Ottomans were. Contemporary historical records, though sparse, indicate that Louis preferred a plan of retreat, in effect ceding the country to Ottoman advances, rather than directly engaging the Ottoman army in open battle. The Hungarian war council – without waiting for reinforcements from Croatia and Transylvania only a few days march away – made a serious tactical error by choosing the battlefield near Mohács, an open but uneven plain with some swampy marshes.

Fichtner writes that before the Battle of Mohács, there was a breakdown of communication between Louis and his brother-in-law, Archduke Ferdinand. Ferdinand was unaware of the urgency of the situation. To make the matter worse, Louis and the Hungarian court failed to inform him that they had decided to fight a decisive battle on the plain of Mohács (this decision was made on 26 August, one day before Ferdinand's departure: in a conference in Louis's camp in Bata, the chancellor Stephen Brodarics advised the king to wait for reinforcements from Austria and Bohemia, but a group of impetuous nobles managed to persuade the king to engage in an open, immediate battle on the plains of Mohacs against the numerically superior Ottomans). Ferdinand, facing religious tensions and uprisings in his own lands as well as his brothers' requests for more troops for other theaters, decided to tend to what he thought to be more urgent affairs first. According to Stephen Fischer-Galati, that literature shows that Louis himself seemed to be unable to fully understand the seriousness or immediacy of the Turkish threat. It was possible that Louis based his confidence on the assurances of John Zápolya and his supporters, who promised to help. Magnates who feared Habsburg interference desired a total Hungarian effort to either contain (militarily or diplomatically) or reach a truce with the Porte.

The Ottomans had advanced toward Mohács almost unopposed. While Louis waited in Buda, they had besieged several towns (Petervarad, Ujlak, and Eszek), and crossed the Sava and Drava Rivers. At Mohács the Hungarians numbered some 25,000 to 30,000 soldiers. The only external help was a small contingent of Polish troops (1,500 soldiers and knights) led by the royal captain Lenart Gnoiński (but organized and equipped by the Papal State). The Ottoman army numbered perhaps 50,000, though some contemporary and modern-day historians put the number of the Ottoman troops at 100,000. Most of the Ottoman Balkan forces registered before this battle were described as Bosnians or Croats.

The Hungarian army was arrayed to take advantage of the terrain and hoped to engage the Ottoman army piecemeal. They had the advantage that their troops were well-rested, while the Turks had just completed a strenuous march in scorching summer heat.

== Battle ==
The battle took place on the afternoon of 29 August 1526, on a wide and waterlogged plain near the village of Mohács. The Hungarian army, numbering around 25,000–30,000 men, was arranged in two lines: the first composed of mercenary infantry and artillery in the centre, with heavy cavalry on both flanks; the second consisted largely of levy infantry and reserve cavalry. Opposing them was an Ottoman force of perhaps 45,000 fighting troops, including Janissaries, Timarli cavalry, conscripted Balkan levies, and artillery, under the overall command of Sultan Suleiman the Magnificent and his grand vizier, Ibrahim Pasha.

Leadership played a crucial role in the unfolding of the battle. Suleiman and Ibrahim, who had left Constantinople together in April with an army of 100,000 men and 300 guns, had prepared carefully for the campaign. While the Sultan remained at the centre of command, Ibrahim led the vanguard, ensured the bridging of rivers, and personally oversaw the advance through southern Hungary. He commanded the Ottoman centre during the battle and was credited by contemporaries with orchestrating a tactical feigned retreat that drew the Hungarians into an encirclement.

The Hungarian leadership, in contrast, was divided and under pressure from nobles who pushed for immediate battle rather than waiting for reinforcements. Confident in the strength of their heavy cavalry, they hoped to break the Ottoman line with a direct assault. In the early afternoon, Archbishop Pál Tomori led a charge that initially drove back the Ottoman front line, causing disorder among the irregulars. Ibrahim Pasha's centre fell back in a controlled manoeuvre, forming a crescent that exposed the flanks of the advancing Hungarian cavalry. As King Louis and the reserves moved in support, the Ottomans launched a counterattack with cavalry and light infantry from both wings, while Janissaries and artillery opened concentrated fire from prepared positions.

According to some accounts, Suleiman himself was struck by Hungarian bullets that hit his cuirass during the charge. The Hungarian army, having advanced too far and too fast, found itself encircled and subjected to concentrated musket and cannon fire. Within two hours, their lines collapsed. Ottoman tactics echoed those used by John Hunyadi against the Ottomans in earlier campaigns, turning the Hungarian strategy back upon itself.

King Louis II attempted to flee but drowned in the marshy terrain near the Csele stream, weighed down by his armour. His body was discovered weeks later, buried in the mud. Suleiman, on finding the corpse, is reported to have expressed regret for the young king's death. Upon encountering the lifeless body of King Louis, the Sultan is said to have lamented: "I came indeed in arms against him; but it was not my wish that he should be thus cut off before he scarcely tasted the sweets of life and royalty."

Among the dead were thousands of Hungarian soldiers and over 1,000 nobles, including seven bishops and twenty-eight barons. It is estimated that over 14,000 Hungarian troops died in the battle, including 4,000 cavalry and 10,000 infantry, with a further 2,000 prisoners executed in the aftermath. Ottoman chroniclers noted the scale of the loss, with one source claiming Suleiman was astonished that such a small force had been sent to oppose him. Suleiman proceeded to Buda, which surrendered without a fight, though his troops looted and burned both Buda and Pest despite his orders.

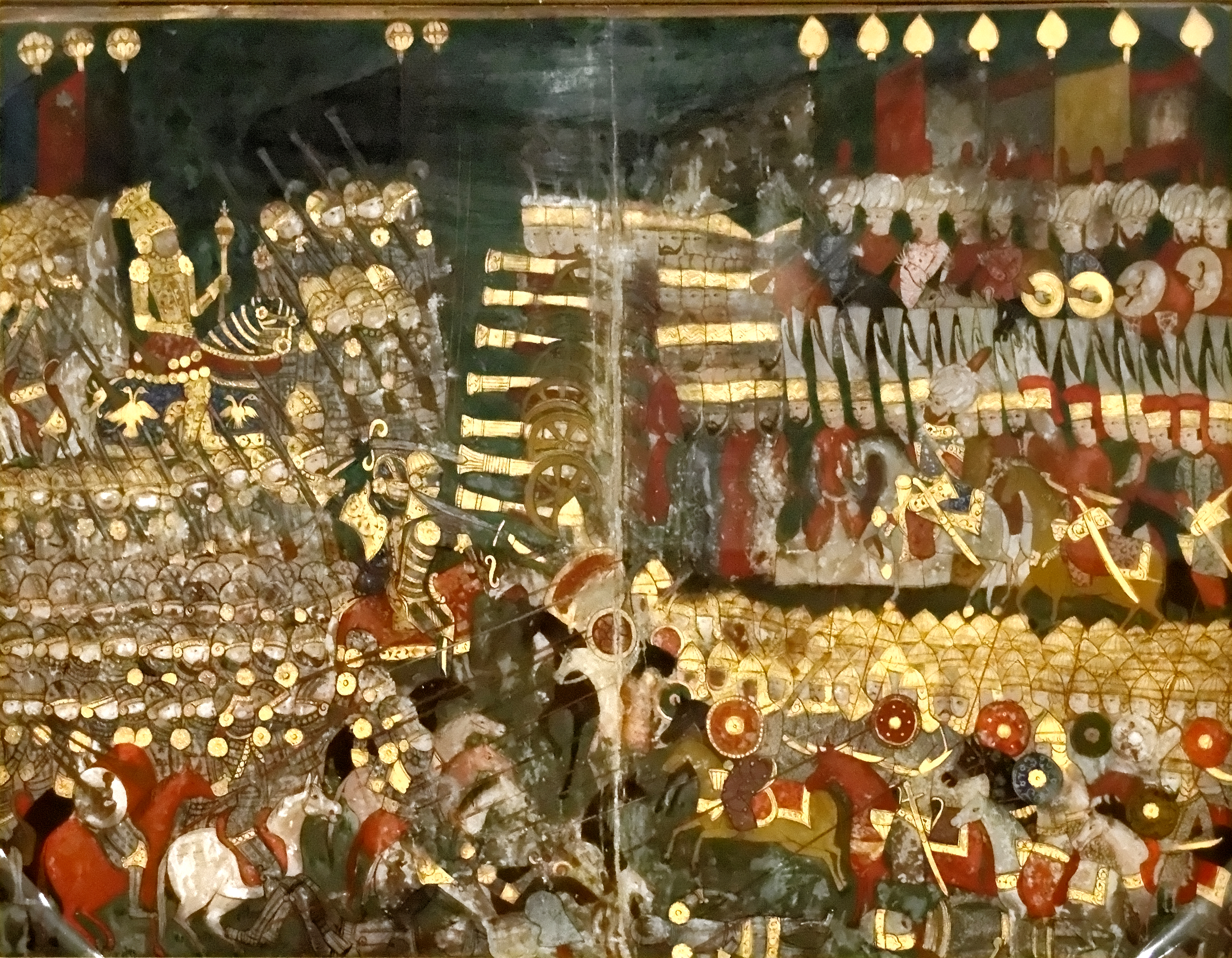
Battle of Mohács (Turkish miniature, 1526)

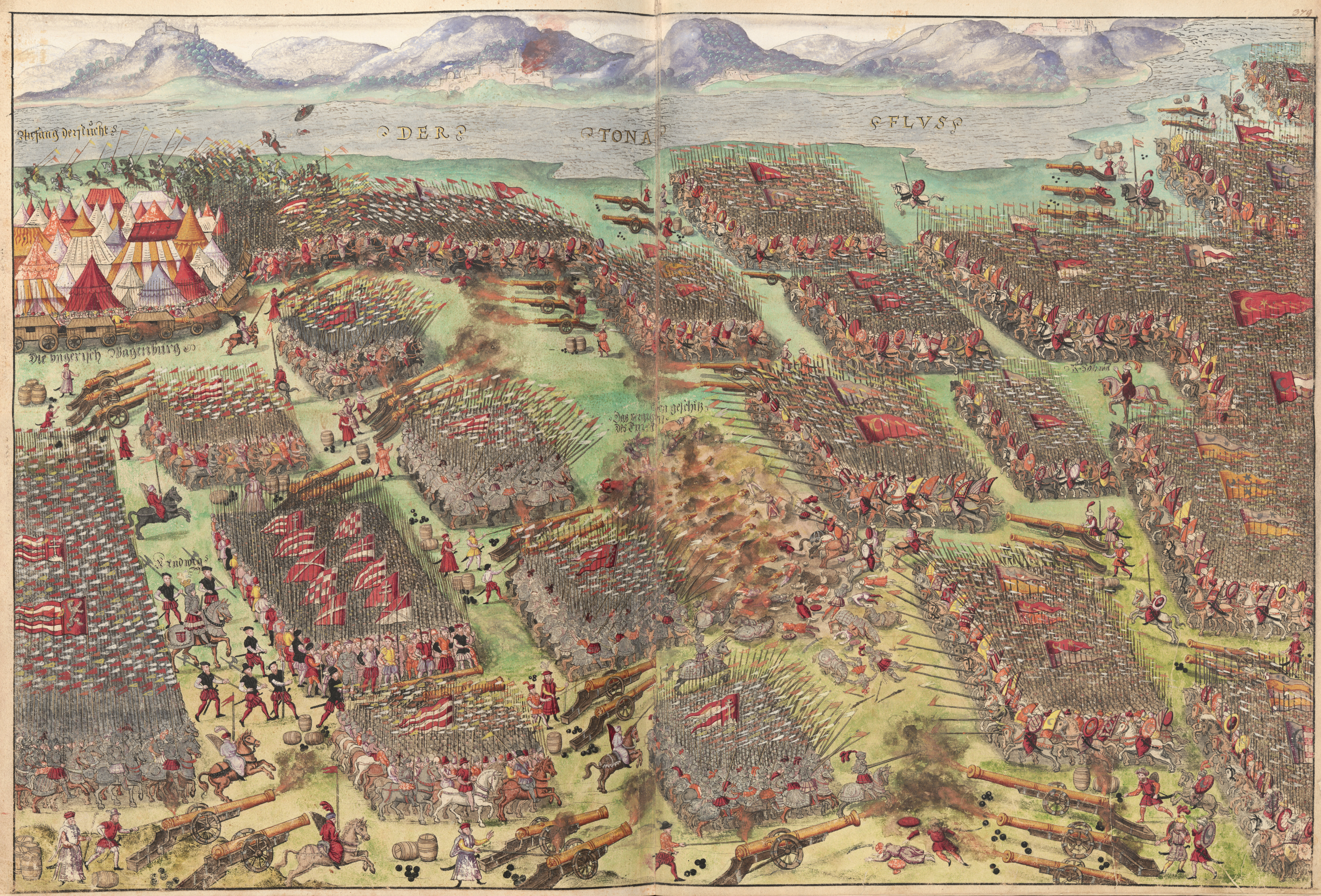
Battle of Mohács (Johann Schreier, 1555) It depicts in detail the Hungarian Wagon fort and the Christian infantry, the Hungarian heavy cavalry and artillery, the Serbian hussars (the only Christian light cavalry units in the battle)

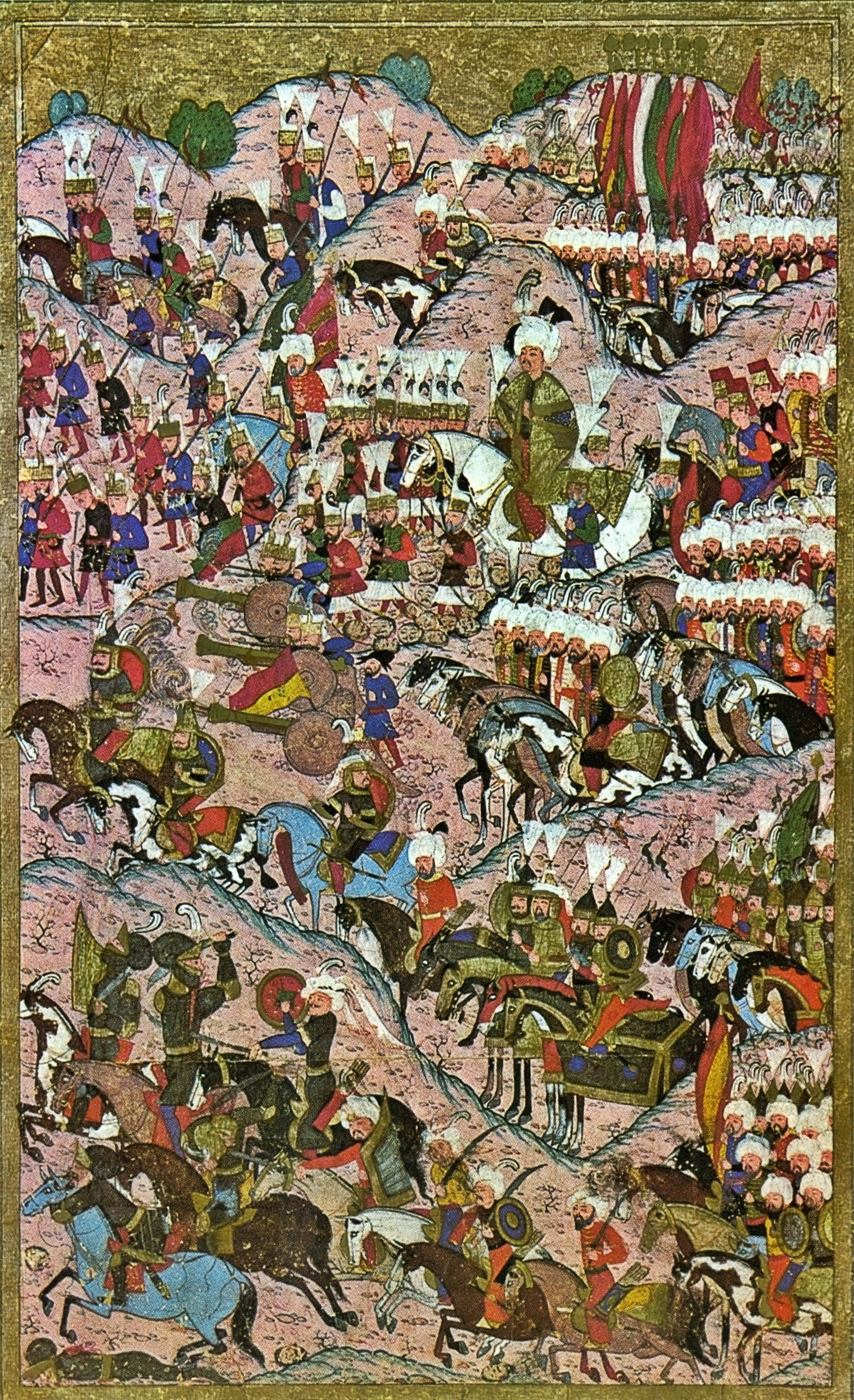
Suleiman I after the victory at Mohács (Hünername of Lokman, 16th century)

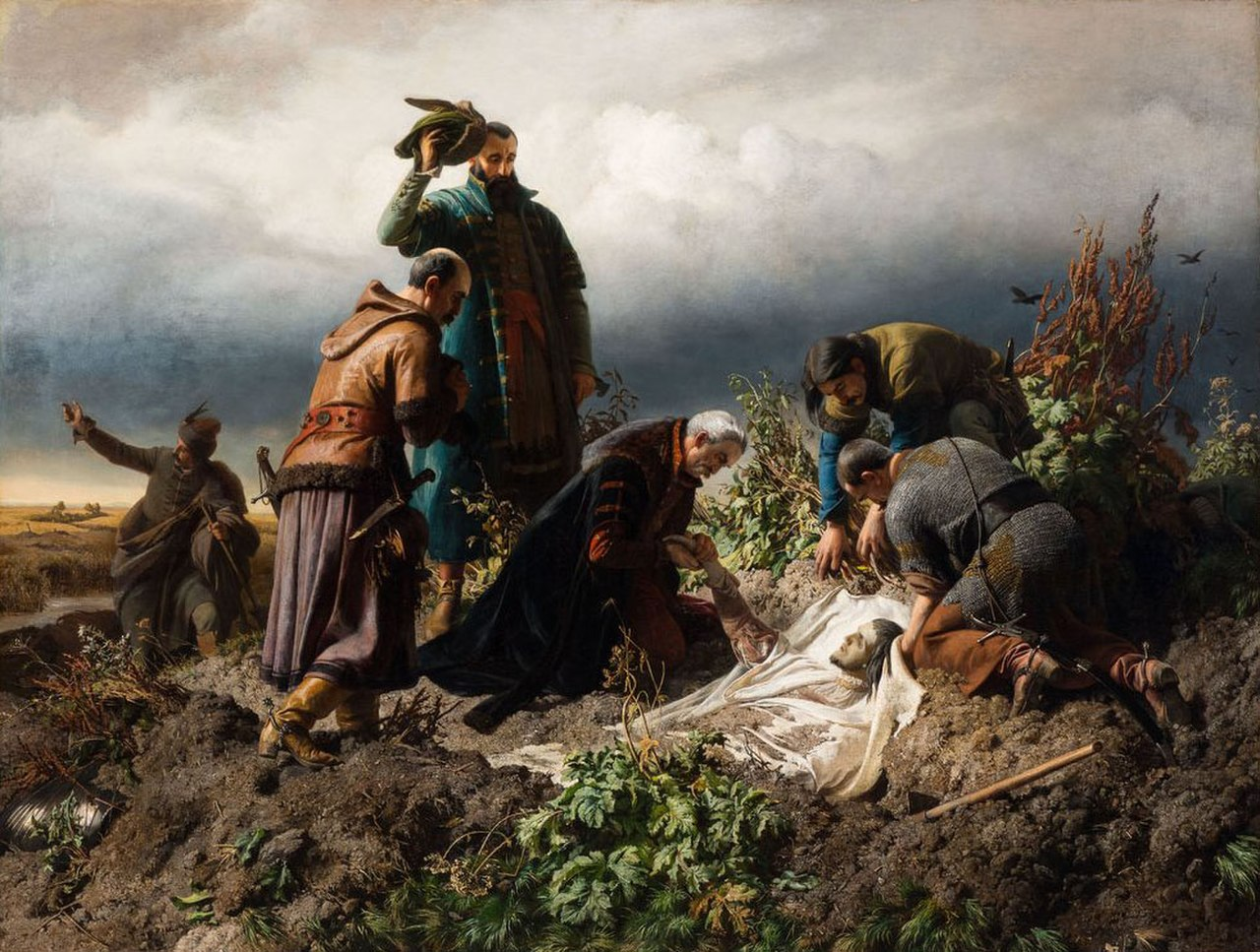
The Discovery of the Corpse of King Louis II (Bertalan Székely, 1860)

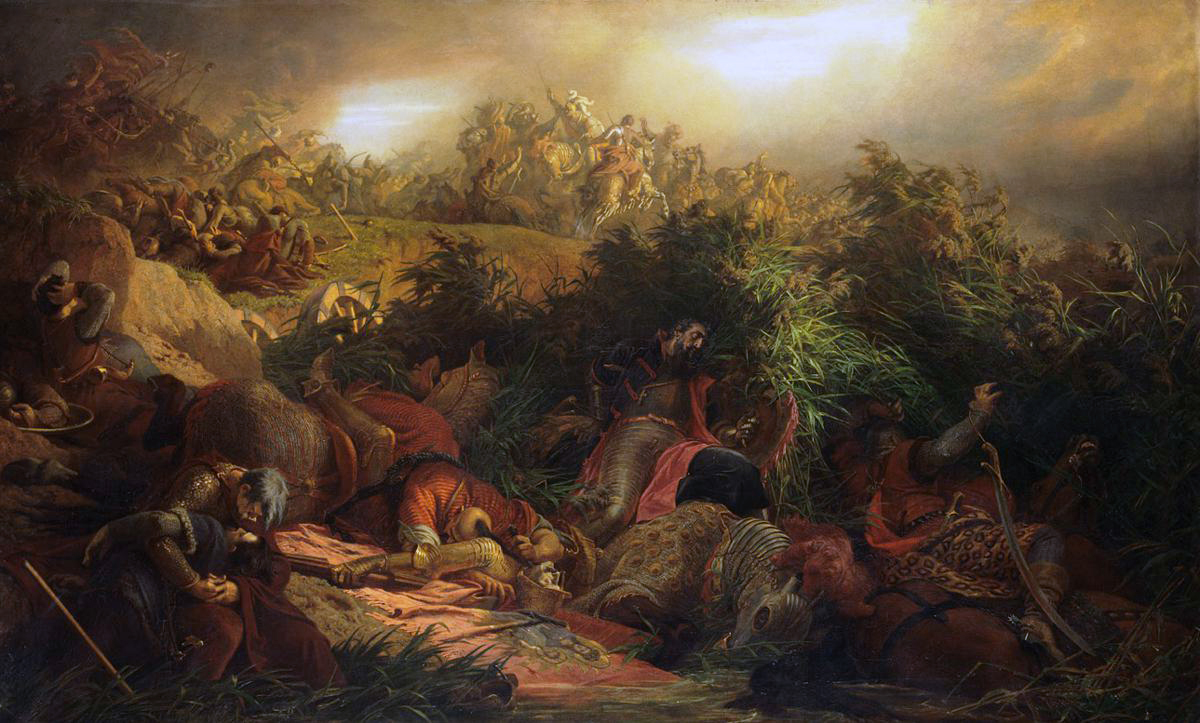
The Battle of Mohács (Bertalan Székely, 1866)

== Aftermath: Military operations after the Battle of Mohács ==
The victory did not give the Ottomans the security they wanted. Buda was left undefended; only the French and Venetian ambassadors waited for the Sultan to congratulate him on his great victory. Though they entered the unguarded evacuated Buda and pillaged the castle and surroundings, they retreated soon afterwards.

On the evening of the battle, Sultan Suleiman and his general staff had no idea of the magnitude of the victory they had achieved. Believing that they were facing only a part of the armies of the Hungarians and her allies that had taken up arms against them that day, they cautiously refrained from pursuing the defeated Hungarian army vigorously and, believing that the battle would continue the next day, kept their army under arms all night.

Only the next day did Suleiman wake up to the fact that he had won a decisive victory on the plain of Mohács, where he remained for four more days with his army. During this time he executed about 2000 captured Hungarian nobles whose bodies were found by archeologists after 2020. On 1 September, Malkoçoğlu Bali Bey received permission and orders to advance with his cavalry for a raid, and on 4 September, after burning Mohács, the army itself began its advance towards Buda, where it arrived on 11 September.

Queen Mary, who was in Buda, received news of the defeat and the death of the king on the evening of 30 August, and, having loaded most of her treasures onto a ship, fled to Pozsony (Pressburg or Posonium since 1918 renamed to Bratislava, capital of Slovakia), accompanied by the bishop of Veszprém, Elek Szalaházy, treasurer, and the papal nuncio, Baron De Burgio. The wealthier part of the population of Buda and Pest followed her. The Buda Castle was left without a guard and the keys were sent ahead to Földvár to the victorious sultan.

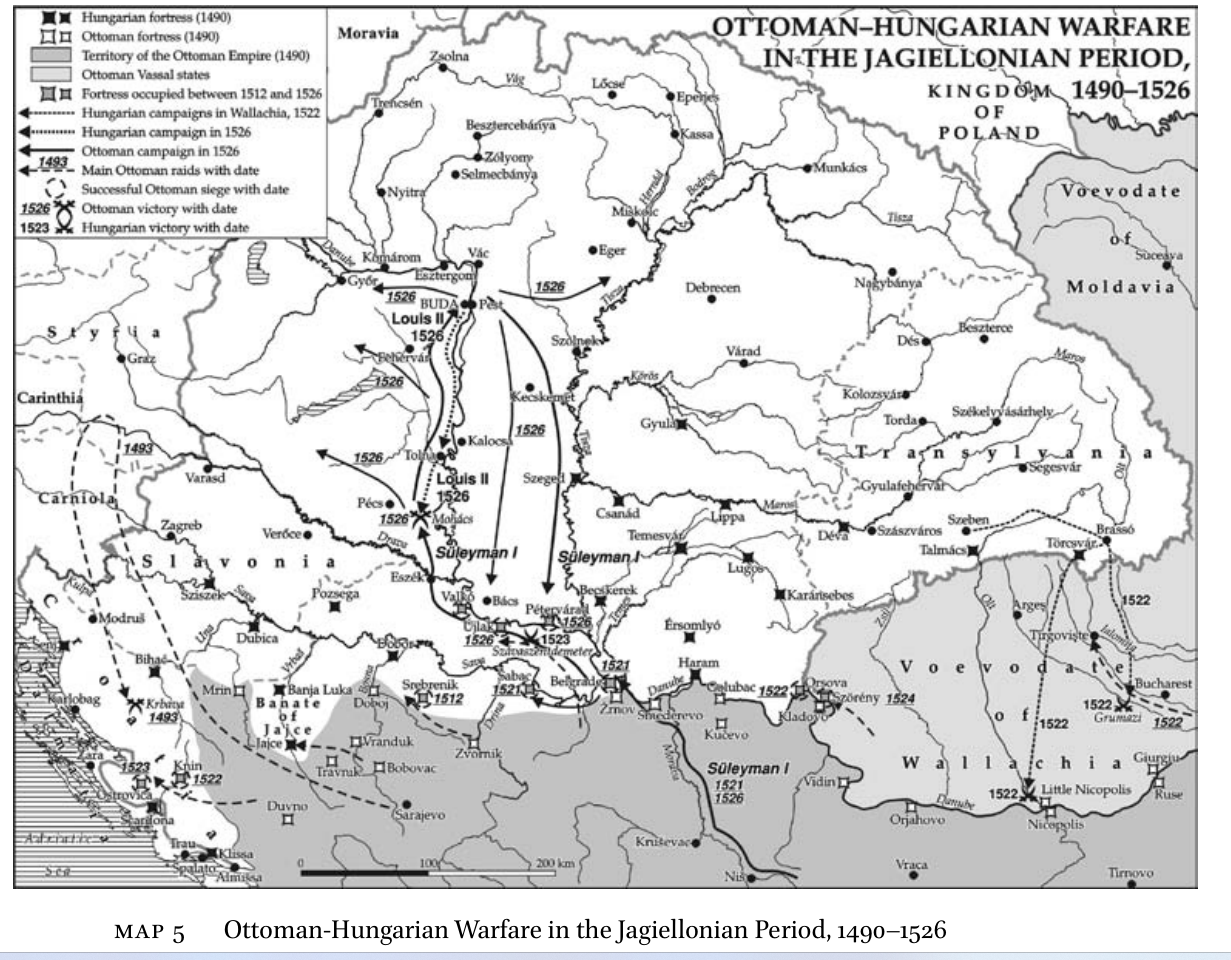
Map of the campaign and looters routes of 1526

Suleiman declared the campaign over with the temporary occupation of Buda, which, despite the fact that orders had been given to spare it, was set on fire on September 14 and 15 together with most of Pest, with the exception of the royal palace, which served as the residence of the Sultan and his entourage. However, this did not prevent his raiding armies from continuing to ravage the west of the Danube to Győr and the Styrian borders. Malkoçoğlu Bali Bey’s horsemen murdered the mainly male population with hair-raising cruelty, and the settlements they came across were plundered and then set on fire, but the castles and fortified places were not much harmed. Pécs, whose citizens who could handle weapons had fought and bled to death at Mohács together with their bishop, opened its gates asking for mercy. However, this was of no use, because the Akinji troops [mostly irregulars who joined to the Sultans army without payment so were interested in looting] plundered, burned and destroyed the city. Székesfehérvár was fortunately saved from destruction by its citizens and the county nobles who had fled there. Visegrád, which had been left without a guard by the governor, was defended by the Pauline and Cseri friars who had fled there with the help of the people who had fled there. Mihály Nagy, the lieutenant of the hajdús of the archbishop of Esztergom defended the fortress of Esztergom successfully. On the other hand, the inhabitants of the area who fled to the Maróth castle of the archbishop of Esztergom met a tragic end; since there was only room for a few people there, the others set up camp between Maróth and Dömös and partly transformed it into a wagon fortress, partly fortified it with ramparts. But these works were not yet fully completed when the Turkish raiding party, which also had a few cannons, began to shell the camp. The defenders held out heroically for a while, but on the third day, September 13, the Turks broke into the camp and brutally massacred about 25,000 people, including old people, women and children. After this, Malkoçoğlu Bali Bey marched to Tata and Komárom. The Esztergom chapter and archbishopric officials fled to the castle of Komárom.with the fallen archbishop and the treasures of the churches. Malkoçoğlu Bali Bey wanted to take the two cities, which were quite heavily occupied, at all costs, but the siege did not take place, because on September 16 the Sultan ordered all troops to gather under Buda by the 21st.

János Szapolyai (Zápolya), who had reached Szeged with his army on 27 August, set off the next day in a light carriage, accompanied only by a few horsemen, towards Mohács, in order to persuade the king and his army to retreat to Buda, as he had suggested earlier. For safety's sake, he took the route not directly to Mohács, but to Tolna, and arrived at Dúsnok on the evening of 29 August, but he could not continue his journey, because due to the torrential rain that had fallen that evening, the roads in the already marshy region between Dúsnok and the Danube were all under water. Therefore, the voivode could only set off further south on 30 August, but on the way he learned of the outcome of the battle fought the day before, and so he immediately turned back and hurried to his army, lest he be cut off by the raiders. The voivode's further intention, according to his later statement, was to gather a large army behind the Tisza, which was a huge defensive line, with which he could then attack the Turks. For this purpose, he contacted Pál Várday, Archbishop of Eger, whom King Louis II had sent to the queen immediately before the Battle of Mohács and who arrived in Buda almost simultaneously with the news of the lost battle. Under such circumstances, the archbishop did not join the fleeing queen, but hurried to his archdiocese, from where on September 1 he issued an appeal to the nobility of Heves, Borsod, Gömör, Tolna and Abauj counties and the towns in the archdiocese to make hasty preparations for defense, and to send envoys to Miskolc to discuss of this defense. Here, the bishop and János Pelsőczi Bebek gathered the belated battalions of several highland counties, and on September 15, they held a meeting with the envoys of the Tiszamellék counties regarding the measures to be taken to prevent further enemy attacks, as a result of which the towns and villages of the highland were also called upon to unite their armies with the battalions of the counties at Verpelét. But this salutary decision had little effect, because the cities did not send their armies there(but prepared to defend themselves), and Szapolyai, upon hearing the news of the Turkish(Ottoman) army's advance towards Buda, did not go to Verpelét with his army group, although he had anticipated its arrival there, but instead, moving up the left bank of the Tisza, reached Mezőtúr on September 10, from where he continued his journey towards Tokaj via Fegyvernek, in order to come into contact with the forces of the northern counties and win them over for himself. After the capture of Buda, Sultan Suleiman, having stopped his campaign in Hungary, decided to lead his army, ignoring the plundered and scorched Transdanubia, back to Pétervárad between the Danube and Tisza and from there to Constantinople. In order to be able to change banks between Buda and Pest, military craftsmen began building a wooden bridge on September 13, which, despite much forced labor, was completed in 6 days, or on September 19. The next day, the army began its crossing to the left bank of the Danube, which continued without a break until September 23, when, due to the collapse of the bridge, the troops who were still on the Buda side had to be transported across the river by boat. Suleiman also loaded onto ships the fabulous treasures of the Matthias era, including statues, weapons, other rarities, and most of the famous Corvinus Library, which he found in the royal palace, and had them all taken to Constantinople.

By midday on 24 September the entire Ottoman-Turkish army was concentrated around Pest and the next day it set out for Pétervárad, in two columns; one column, consisting of the Rumelian corps, under the command of Grand Vizier Ibrahim, was at Szeged, while the other column, consisting of all the other troops, under the personal command of the Sultan, marched along the Danube via Baja-Zombor. Ibrahim's column suffered greatly from the lack of water; therefore the Grand Vizier hastened the march as much as he could, which in turn resulted in the death of a great many horses. On 29 September this column reached Szeged, whose inhabitants, on hearing of the enemy's arrival, "moved all their families and goods as many they could to the other side of the Tisza." Even during the advance so far, “we obtained an extraordinary amount of booty and took many prisoners; the army was in abundance of flour, wheat, barley, fodder and other foodstuffs.” In Szeged, which was burned in all its parts, much booty and prisoners were taken. “Since there were an extraordinary number of sheep in the said city, 50,000 sheep were driven away for the pasha and 20,000 for the defterdar (chief financial official) Iskander Celebi.” On October 2, Ibrahim's column reached Titel, near which a Hungarian commander named Deli-Rádics successfully carried out a raid against the Turks, "capturing three to four hundred people alive from among the raiders in the area, and slaughtering about five hundred, and generally blocking the roads, he either captured or killed those coming from any direction." In retaliation, the Bosnian Bey Khosrev, commander of the rearguard, was ordered to ambush the pursuing Hungarian troops, kill some of them, and present six alive to the pasha. On the evening of October 3, Ibrahim arrived with his column in front of Pétervárad, where he immediately began building the bridge over the Danube. The column led by the Sultan, having marched for 11 days and rested for 3 days, and having plundered, pillaged and destroyed everything along the way, only arrived near Pétervárad on October 7. On the way, it came across a large fortified place, which it began to besiege, while a very fierce battle ensued. Finally - after the Janissary Agha, Shedsa Agha, the Samsundzi-Bashi (commander of the 71st Janissary Regiment), the Janissary Chausza (chief judge) and several infantry officers, as well as many sipahi (feudal cavalry soldiers) were killed and several aghas (court officers) were wounded - it was captured, plundered and robbed. According to Kemalpasazade, this fortified place was Bács[the main fortress of Kalocsa Archdiocese], who remembers the things carried by the Suleiman Column as follows:

The Sultan set off back along the Danube River with his valiant army of warriors of faith. In the countryside that lay in his path, hunting like lions the vile creatures of a vicious breed similar to biting dogs and wolves, leaving no house or field for the enemy of evil nature, either on the plain or on the mountain, mercilessly destroying the grain and other goods necessary for their survival, he arrived at a strong castle, the towers of which faced the sun, its bastions reached the sky, and which the people knew as Bacs. The wicked, who had locked themselves in this solid fortress built on a stone foundation, felt completely safe from plunder", but ... after our troops had invaded "plundered the markets and streets, after tearing down this the flowers, foliage and fruits of the flower garden, they set fire to the houses. This city, which just now resembled a magnificent rose garden, now became a burning furnace, the smoke of which rose in clouds towards the vault of the blue sky."

— Kemálpasazáde(Thúry, Török történetírók[Contemporary Turkish historians] I, 272.)

– Dselálzáde calls the castle or city where this large-scale clash took place on October 5 as "Bads"8, and this is undoubtedly also the same as Bács. According to other information, this fortified place, surrounded by swamps, ditches and carts and offering great resistance, was somewhere between Bács and Pétervárad. However, it is most likely that the Turks had a strong fight in both places, as can be established almost without any doubt from the narrative of Dselálzáde – Pecsevi and Szolakzáde also mention the costly battles that took place around the aforementioned swamp castle. On October 8 and 9, the Turkish army, with rich booty and an inestimable number of prisoners, crossed the Danube bridge built by Ibrahim at Pétervárad, where Suleiman received news from Anatolia that a rebellion had broken out in the province of Zulkadr, located at the foot of Mount Taurus in Asia Minor. Therefore, he sent Behram Beglerbeg with the army of Asia Minor in rapid marches, sent the European vassals home, and himself, with his permanent troops, also hurried to Constantinople with unusually rapid marches, where he arrived on November 13. As a result of his campaign, Suleiman only retained Pétervárad, Illok, and the rebuilt Szalankamen, which he had restored and heavily garrisoned.

== Aftermath 1526 ==
It took until 1541 when the Ottomans finally made the decision to occupy Buda following the 1541 Siege of Buda. However, for all intents and purposes, the Battle of Mohács meant the end of the independent Kingdom of Hungary as a unified entity. Amid political chaos, the divided Hungarian nobility elected two kings simultaneously, John Zápolya in 1526 and the Habsburg Archduke, Ferdinand of Austria in late 1526 who founded a new Hungarian dynasty of kings. The Ottoman occupation was contested by the Habsburg Archduke of Austria, Ferdinand I, Louis's brother-in-law and successor by treaty with King Vladislaus II. Ferdinand's main goal was to create a new empire from his new kingdoms what was official name changed only in 1804 as Austrian Empire.

Bohemia and Moravia fell to the Habsburgs, who also dominated the northern and western parts of Hungary and the remnants of the Kingdom of Croatia, while the Ottomans held central Hungary and suzerainty over semi-independent Transylvania which became a principality in 1571. This provided the Hungarians with sufficient impetus to continue to resist the Ottoman occupation, which they did for another seventy years.

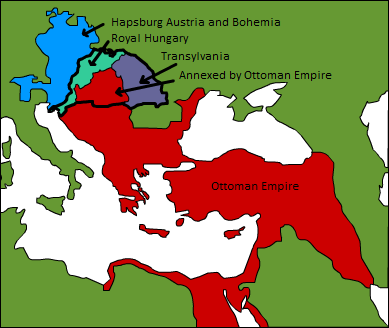
Kingdom of Hungary before 1526, and the 3 parts into which it was divided after 1541: Royal Hungary, Transylvania(officially established in 1571), and the part that was annexed by the Ottoman Empire.

The Austrian branch of Habsburg monarchs needed the economic power of Hungary for the Ottoman wars. During the Ottoman wars the territory controlled by the Kingdom of Hungary shrank by around 60%. Despite these territorial and demographic losses, the smaller, heavily war-torn Royal Hungary remained as economically important as the Austrian hereditary lands or the Bohemian crown lands in the late 16th century. Of Ferdinand's territories, the depleted Kingdom of Hungary was at that time his largest source of revenue.

The subsequent near constant warfare required a sustained commitment of Ottoman forces, proving a drain on resources that the largely rural and war-torn kingdom proved unable to repay. Crusader armies besieged Buda several times during the 16th-17th century (1530, 1540,1541,1542,1598,1602,1603,1684,1686). Sultan Suleiman himself died of natural causes in Hungary during the Battle of Szigetvár in 1566. There were also two Ottoman sieges of Eger: the first siege in 1552 was unsuccessful and the city did not fall until 1596, seventy years after the Ottoman victory at Mohács. The Turks proved unable to conquer the northern and western parts of Hungary, which belonged to the Habsburg monarchs who were the official royal family of the Hungarian Kingdom.

A book on the Turkish culture was written by Georgius Bartholomaeus with information obtained from Christian troops released by the Ottomans after the battle.

== Legacy ==
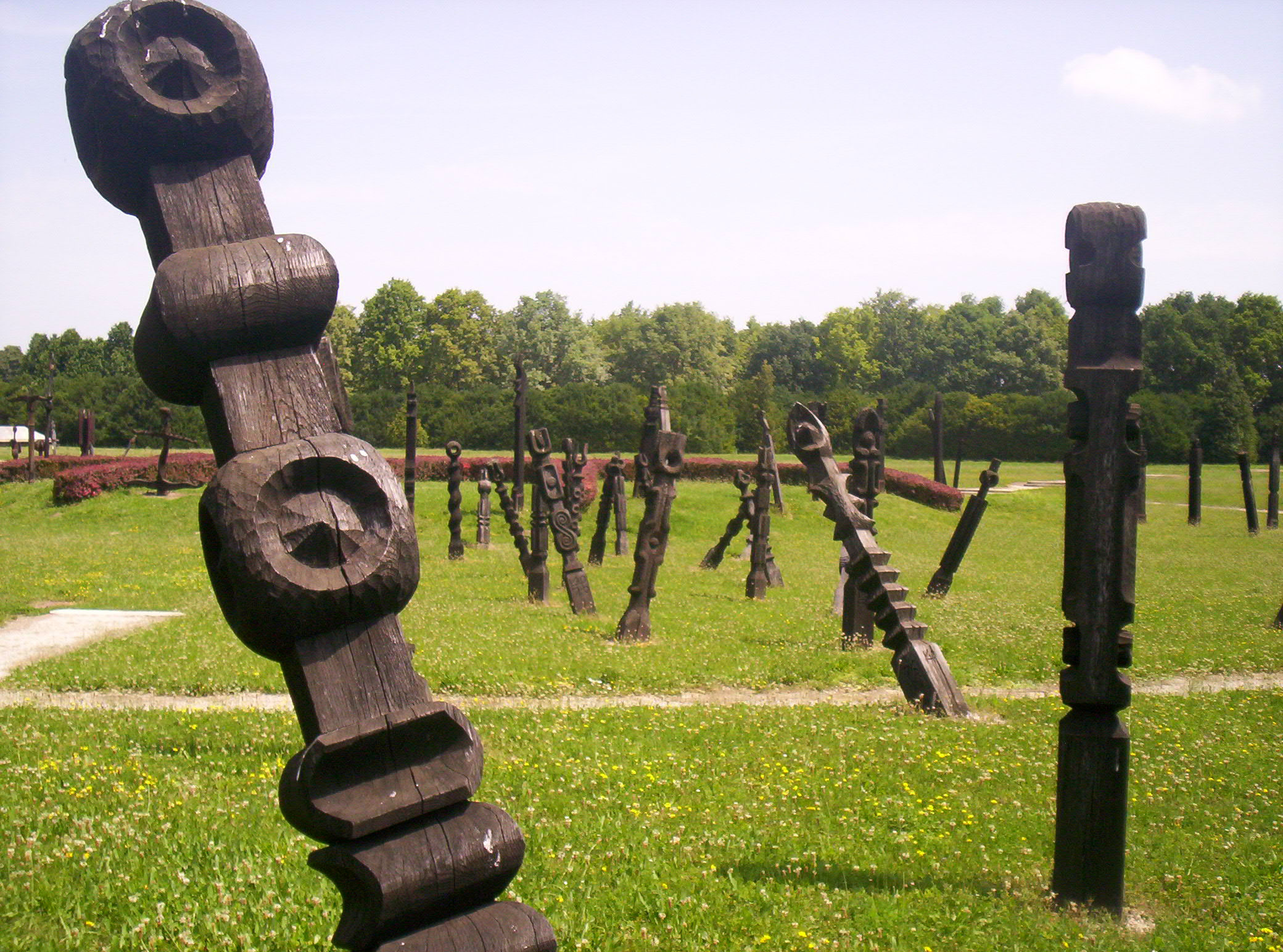
Markers at the Mohacs Monument show where bodies of nobles, knights, soldiers, and horses were found

Mohács is seen by many Hungarians as the decisive downward turning point in the country's history, a national trauma that persists in the nation's folk memory. To indicate magnitude of bad luck at hand, Hungarians still say: "more was lost at Mohács" (Hungarian: Több is veszett Mohácsnál). Hungarians view Mohács as marking the end of Hungary as an independent and powerful European nation.

Whilst Mohács was a decisive loss, it was the aftermath that truly put an end to fully independent Hungary. The ensuing two hundred years of near constant warfare between the two empires, Habsburg and Ottoman, turned Hungary into a perpetual battlefield and its territories were split into three parts. The countryside was regularly ravaged by armies moving back and forth, in turn devastating the population. Only in the 19th century would Hungary reestablish its former boundaries, with full independence from Habsburg rule coming only after the First World War. The battlefield, beside the village of Sátorhely, became an official national historical memorial site in 1976 on the 450th anniversary of the battle. The memorial was designed by architect György Vadász. A new reception hall and exhibition building, also designed by Vadász and partially funded by the European Union, was completed in 2011.

== References and further reading ==
- Pap, Norbert, ed. (2024). The battle of Mohács, 1526. History of warfare. Leiden Boston: Brill. ISBN 978-90-04-70749-8.
- Rady, Martyn (2023). The Habsburgs: To Rule the World'. Moscow: Альпина нон-Фикшн. ISBN 978-5-00139-266-8.
- Brodarics, Istvan[Stephanus Brodericus 1480–1539]: De conflictu Hungarorum cum Turcis ad Mohacz verissima historia. 1527, Krakow [It was originally a written report for the Polish king Sigismund I.] https://real-r.mtak.hu/1472/
- Agnew, Hugh (2013). The Czechs and the Lands of the Bohemian Crown.
- Király, Béla K., and Gunther Erich Rothenberg. War and Society in East Central Europe: The fall of medieval kingdom of Hungary: Mohacs 1526 – Buda 1541 (Brooklyn College Press, 1989).
- Minahan, James B. One Europe, many nations: a historical dictionary of European national groups, (Greenwood Press, 2000).
- Molnár, Miklós, A Concise History of Hungary (Cambridge UP, 2001).
- Nicolle, David, Hungary and the fall of Eastern Europe, 1000–1568 (Osprey, 1988).
- Palffy, Geza. The Kingdom of Hungary and the Habsburg Monarchy in the Sixteenth Century (East European Monographs, distributed by Columbia University Press, 2010) 406 pages; Covers the period after the battle of Mohacs in 1526 when the Kingdom of Hungary was partitioned in three, with one segment going to the Habsburgs.
- Overy, R. J. (2014). A History of War in 100 Battles. Oxford University Press.
- Pálosfalvi, Tamás. From Nicopolis to Mohács: A History of Ottoman–Hungarian Warfare, 1389–1526 (Brill, 2018)
- Rady, Martyn. "Rethinking Jagiełło Hungary (1490–1526)." Central Europe 3.1 (2005): 3–18. online
- Stavrianos, L.S. Balkans Since 1453 (C. Hurst & Co. Publishers, 2000).
- Szabó, János B. "The Ottoman Conquest in Hungary: Decisive Events (Belgrade 1521, Mohács 1526, Vienna 1529, Buda 1541) and Results." in The Battle for Central Europe (Brill, 2019) pp. 263–275.
- I. Szulejmán [hadi] naplói. (az 1521, 1526, 1529, 1532-ik év).[Selection of war diaries of Suleiman sultan translated from Turkish to Hungarian] 277–363 p. In: Thúry József: Török-Magyarkori Történelmi emlekek I.Török történetírók. Budapest, 1893, Magyar Tudományos Akadémia. 434 p. https://archive.org/details/trktrtne01thuruoft
- Turnbull, Stephen. The Ottoman Empire 1326–1699 (Osprey, 2003).
- Verancsics, Antal [1507–1573]: Memoria rerum que in Hungária nato rege Ludovico ultimo acciderunt, qui fuit ultimi Ladislai filius. Összes munkái között [among all of his works]: Monumenta Hungáriáé Historica Scriptores III. Közli: Szalay László. Pest. 1857
- History Foundation, Improvement of Balkan History Textbooks Project Reports (2001) ISBN 975-7306-91-6
