= Christoph Frankopan =

Croatian count

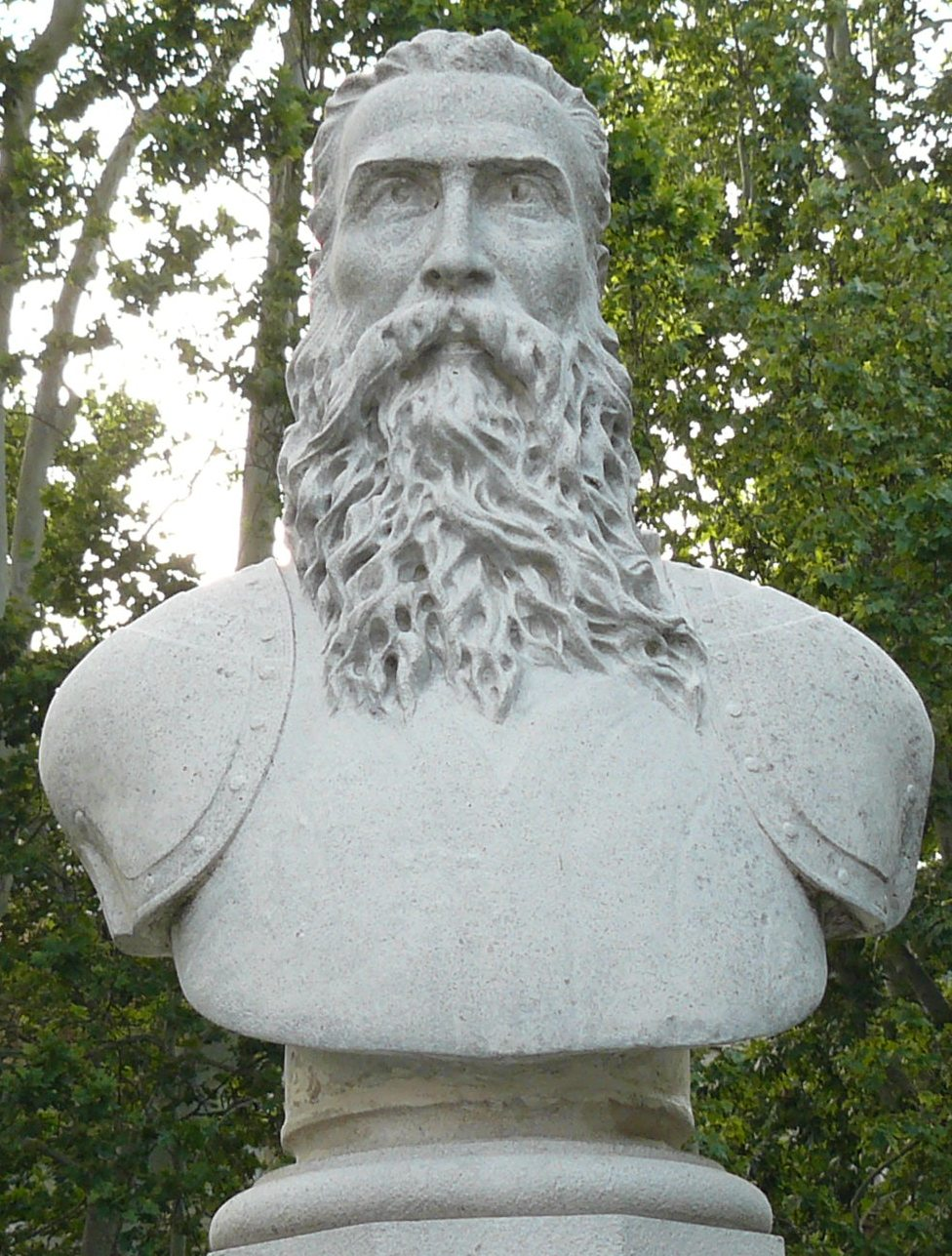
- Bust of Christoph Frankopan

Ban of Croatia, Dalmatia and Slavonia
- Reign: 1526–1527
- Predecessor: Ivan Karlović; Ferenc Batthyány
- Successor: Ferenc Batthyány
- Born: 1482; Modruš, Croatia
- Died: 22 September 1527 (aged 44–45); Varaždin, Croatia
- Noble family: House of Frankopan
- Spouses: 1. Apollonia Lang; 2. Anna Drágffy
- Issue: none
- Father: Bernardin Frankopan
- Mother: Luisa of Aragon

Christoph Frankopan (Croatian: Krsto Frankopan Brinjski, Hungarian: Frangepán Kristóf; Italian: Cristoforo Frangipani; 1482 – 27 September 1527) was a Croatian count from the noble House of Frankopan. He was born in a dangerous time, which included the fall of Bosnia to the Ottoman Empire and the start of the Hundred Years' Croatian-Ottoman War. As a supporter of King John I of Hungary during the succession crisis between János Zápolya and Ferdinand Habsburg, he was named the ban of Croatia in 1526, and died the following year while leading an army financed by Zápolya.

== Early life ==
Frankopan was born in 1482, in Modruš, son of the Croatian nobleman Bernardin Frankopan (1452–1529) and Lujza (Luisa) Marzano of Aragon [hu], a granddaughter of King Alfonso V of Aragon. His siblings were Beatrice, Ferdinand, Matija (Mátyás), Ivan Franjo (János Ferenc), Marija Magdalena (Mária Magdolna), Elizabeta (Erzsébet), Katarina (Katalin) and Eufrozina (Fruzsina).

Bernardin Frankopan was a loyal subject of King Matthias Corvinus of Hungary. Decades later, after the death of the King Matthias, the Hungarian crown passed to the Polish-Lithuanian House of Jagiellon with Vladislas II of Hungary in 1490. In 1493, Krsto's father Bernardin fought at the Battle of Krbava, a massacre from which he barely escaped. During the battle, Ivan Frankopan Cetinski was killed and Nikola VI Frankopan Tržački was captured and later ransomed.

In 1496, by the influence of the Frankopan family, Christoph's sister, Beatrice de Frangepan, was married to John Corvinus, the illegitimate son of the deceased King Mátyás Hunyadi of Hungary. Christoph grew loyal to the new King and decades later bravely fought against Venice and the Ottoman Empire under emperor Maximilian I and Louis II of Hungary (Vladislas II's son).

== Habsburg service ==
In 1505, at 23 years of age, Krsto Frankopan entered the military service of Maximilian I of Habsburg, Archduke of Austria and King of the Romans. He fought in the War of the League of Cambrai (1508–16) against the Republic of Venice and he won many battles including taking Devin and Pazin (1509). In battle, he distionguished himself as a soldier and leader, and for this, in 1510, Maximilian I, now Emperor of the Holy Roman Empire, gave him Podgrad and some possessions of the city of Postojna, and appointed Krsto an imperial adviser. In 1511, he was wounded in the face during the attack on the castle of Muggia near Trieste.

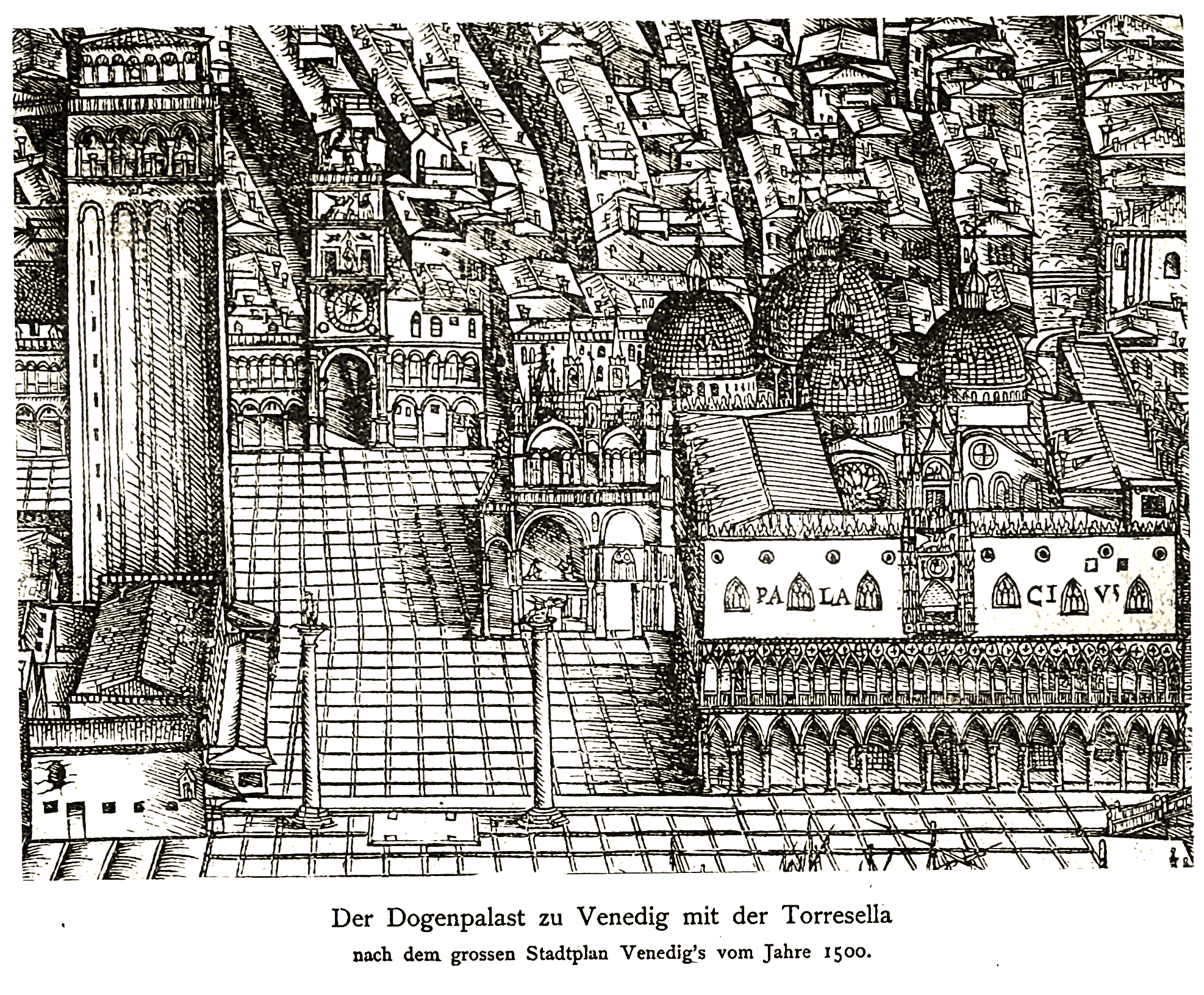
Doge's palace and the Torresella prison in Venice

In 1512 and 1513, with his father, Krsto tried to take back the ancestral island of Krk from the Venetians who took it from the Frankopan family in 1480. In the second half of 1513 and the first half of 1514, he once again went into battle against the Venetians and took a large area of Friuli, including Monfalcone, Cividale del Friuli, Udine but the Venetians later took them back. In June of 1514, during an attack on Marano (Gradiška) he was captured and imprisoned in the “La Torresella” in the Doge's Palace. The imprisonment was not in a dungeon but in comfortable quarters and he had to pay his own expenses. Krsto expects to be released for a ransom, but due to his nigh status, he is kept captive by the Venetians until 1519, when the Venetians agree to hand him over to Francois I, King of France, who wanted to exchange him for a relative being held in captivity by Charles I, King of Spain. Krsto was moved to Milan, where on October 14, 1519, he bribed two guards and escaped.

Soon after his escape, Krsto returned to Habsburg service. After the death of Emperor Maximilian I (January 12, 1519), in 1520, he traveled to Emperor Charles V's court to confirm the estates given to him previously, which Charles does. Krsto was also appointed Captain of Rašpor (military commander of Istra) and the Karst (Kras) region. Frankopan then lived in Maran (Gradiška) and in the royal court. After Archduke Ferdinand did not fulfill some of his promises, on January 15, 1523, with Ferdinand's permission, he returned to his family estates in Croatia. Together with his father, he tried in vain to recover the family estates (Senj and others) that were taken from their family by King Matthias in 1469. Krsto entered the service of King Lajos II. In September of 1523, in the place of his sick father, Krsto went to Rome to ask Pope VI Hadrian to help Croatia fight the Turks. He gave a speech titled "Oratio Ad Adrianum Sextum...".

In June 1525, on his own initiative, Krsto led a mission to deliver food to the besieged fortress at Jajce, for which King Lajos called him "Protector of the Kingdoms of Croatia, Dalmatia and Slavonia", and Europeans called him "Hero of Jajce". At the Diet of Hatvan, held on July 4, 1525, many nobles asked for Frankopan to be appointed Ban of Croatia but King Lajos (Louis) did not agree. Again, in vain, Frankopan tried to have the city of Senj returned to the Frankopan family. After an argument between Krsto and László Szalkai [hu], the archbishop and chancellor of Esztergom, and primate of Hungary, escalated into a fight during which the archbishop grabbed Krsto by his beard and in response, Krsto slapped, possibly punched, him in the face. For this Krsto was imprisoned for three days. Following his release, Krsto returned to the service of Archduke Ferdinand.

== Battle of Mohács ==
In the summer of 1526, while Sultan Suleiman, with the army of the Ottoman Empire, marched to Hungary, King Lajos called on all the princes of Europe for help, but little came. While Ferenc Batthyány, the Ban of Croatia, joined the king with his army, few other nobles joined. There is speculation that Archduke Ferdinand may have warned them to protect their own homeland, and thus Habsburg lands, or possibly the Croats did not want to help a king who did not help them when they were in need - as they complained at the Sabor of Križevci, held on January 25, 1526, at which they complained about King Lajos and discussed finding a new king. As King Lajos had no generals that could command an army against the Ottomans, he called on Krsto Frankopan, who, after receiving permission from Archduke Ferdinand, rode with 450 horsemen to join the king. By August 26, Krsto was in Zagreb, seeking money and making final preparations to join the king. Frankopan sent a letter to King Lajos, advising him not to enter a battle with the Sultan, and to stay in Buda or some other safe place until János Zápolya, the Bohemians, and Frankopan with his Croats arrived. King Lajos did not heed Frankopan's warning, and died at the Battle of Mohács, on August 29, 1526. Among the Croats that died was Krsto's brother Matija (Matthew) Frankopan.

On September 5, in a letter written in Croatian glagolitic script, Frankopan informs Franjo Jožefić (Jozefics Ferenc), the Bishop of Senj, why he could not arrive at Mohács and that he regrets the loss of King Louis, but, in his opinion, the Hungarian nobles that risked their king and kingdom deserved the lesson they received from the Sultan. He was of the opinion that the defeat of the Hungarians was "... a blessing and the lasting salvation of Croatia" because had they won, their egos would have known no bounds.

== In service of Záploya ==
After the defeat of Hungary at the Battle of Mohács (1526), and the death of King Lajos (Louis) II, the Hungarian throne was empty. Archduke Ferdinand of Habsburg, based on his marriage to Anna Jagellonica, the sister of King Lajos, immediately claimed the throne of Hungary for himself. Most of the Hungarian gentry did not want a foreign king, and thus wealthy Hungarian Count János Zápolya, based on the Rákos Decree (1505), by which the Hungarian nobles proclaimed that no foreign prince may be elected king of Hungary. Thus started a civil war in Croatia and Hungary between the pro-Habsburg faction led by Ferdinand and the pro-Nationalist faction led by Zápolya, and Krsto Frankopan decided to align with the latter.

On September 23, Krsto attended a Sabor in Koprivnica (Kapronca), where the nobles appointed him governor (captain-in-chief) of the counties of Baranya, Pozega, Somogy, and Zala. From there, he went to Poszony (Bratislava). He next attends the coronation of János Zápolya, on November 11, 1526. Details are sparse, but Zápolya appointed him Ban of Croatia, Slavonia, and Dalmatia, captain-in-chief of Hungary between the Drava and Danube, and gave him 20,000 gold forints to hire an army to consolidate his control over the region but most importantly, Zápolya gave Krsto the city of Senj. On December 18, 1526, Krsto, convened a Sabor of Slavonia, at which the nobles of Slavonia elected to join Zápolya.

Most of the Croatian nobility gathered in Cetin and elected Ferdinand I as king on 1 January 1527. Christoph Frankopan was the only member of the higher Croatian nobility who did not attend. Eventually, both of Ferdinand and Zápolya were crowned as Kings of Croatia and Hungary. Zápolya stayed in the royal city of Buda, and the Habsburg went back to his Austrian domains without giving up claim to the Hungarian throne. In the Hungarian campaign of 1527–1528, Krsto fought in Slavonia against Count Francis Batthyány, who supported the Habsburg's claim.

== Krsto's death ==
In early July of 1527, Frankopan met with French ambassador Antonio Rincon to plan a meeting with Serbian war-leader Jovan (Črni, Black) Nenad to negotiate his loyalty to Zápolya, but the meeting did not happen. On July 9, Ferdinand instructed his diplomat Johannes Habardanecz [hu] to, at all costs, prevent the meeting between Frankopan and war-leader Jovan. Ferdinand understands the threat that Frankopan poses and thus offers Habardanecz a reward of 16,000 gulden for capturing Frankopan and Rincon and sending them to Vienna but if that is not possible, hanging them both on the spot. To ensure Frankopan's assassination, Ferdinand also sends Ferenc Batthyány, Frankopan's enemy, after him and, on September 21, also instructs István Majláth to send two spies against Frankopan.

On September 27, during the siege of the castle, while reconnoitring the fortress at Varaždin (Varasd), Frankopan was hit in the abdomen by a ball, probably from a wall gun (heavy arquebus). Though suffering a grievous gut wound, with his intestines visible, Krsto rode to his camp, but later that night, while being transported for medical care, Krsto died. It is believed that the spies succeeded because afterwards, Majláth received Fogaras Castle. János Tahy of Vrana took over Frankopan's army, but because he was hated by the Croats, Zapolya's army in Croatia and Slavonia soon fell apart.

== Marriages ==
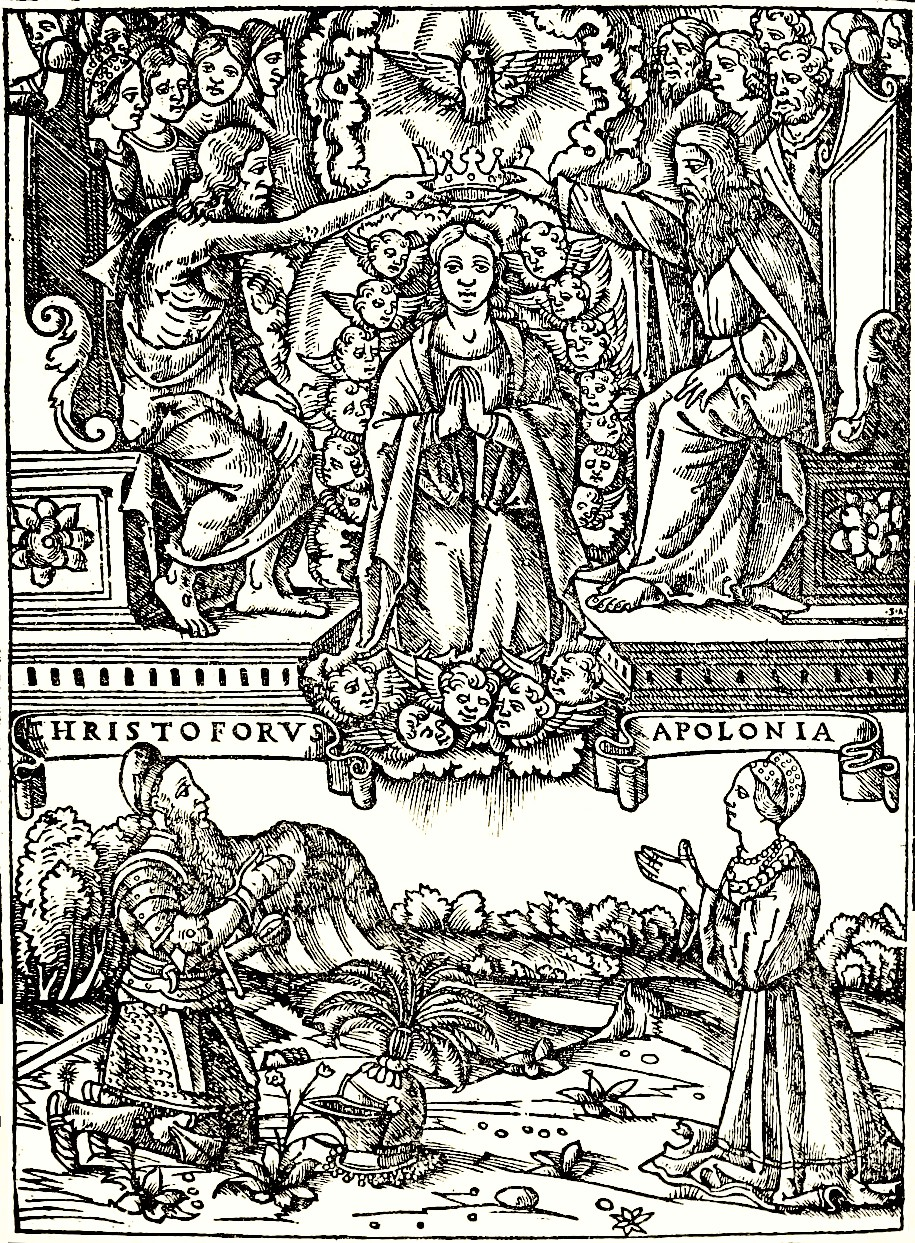
“Breviarium Romanum”, also referred to as The Frankapan Breviary (1518, Venice) produced by Krsto and Apollonia Frankopan while Krsto was held as a prisoner of war in Venice.

Sometimes great soldiers, in addition to glorious battles, also have near mythical love stories. In April of 1513, 31-year-old Krsto was married for the first time, to Apollonia Lang of Augsburg, the older sister of the archbishop-cardinal of Salzburg Matthäus Lang von Wellenburg. Seven years older than Krsto, she was also a wealthy widow, whose first husband, Julian Graf von Lodron, had died in 1510.

It is said that, for that time, Krsto and Apollonia shared something rare in their marriage - true love, evidenced by a ring that Apollonia gave to Krsto, which had the inscription Mit Willen dyn eygen (Willingly thine own!).

While Krsto was imprisoned in Venice, Apollonia could not be away from him and negotiated with the Venetian government to be allowed to live with her husband in captivity. She was given permission, and Apollonia lived with Krsto, not in a dungeon but in comfortable quarters, for which Krsto had to pay all expenses. Though imprisoned, Krsto and Apollonia were not idle — in 1518, they printed a breviary (a book of the prayers, hymns, psalms), which was also testament to their love. The breviary, printed in Venice, in 1518, is titled “Breviarium Romanum”, and also referred to as the Frankopan Breviary. During her stay in Venice, Apollonia became ill.

Krsto had hoped to be released for a ransom, but in 1519 the Venetians gave him to Francois I, King of France, who wanted to exchange him for a relative being held in captivity by Charles I, King of Spain. Frankopan was transferred to a prison in Milan, and Apollonia once again tried to join him. In Milan, the illness worsened and Apollona died, with some sources saying on September 4, 1519, while others say January 4, 1520. Apollonia's body was taken to a Frankopan castle near Koper in Istria, and buried.

Krsto's second wife was the Hungarian noblewoman Anna Drágffy [hu], widow of László IV Kanizsai [hu]. Christoph had no children from either marriage.

== Literature ==
Krsto Frankopan is remembered in two books:

By Henry Thode: German: Der Ring des Frangipani (1895) and in English: Frangipani's Ring (1900)

By Milutin Cihlar Nehajev: Croatian: Vuci (1928), a historical drama.

== See also ==
- History of Croatia
- History of Hungary

Christoph I House of Frankopan Born: 1482 Died: 27 September 1527
Political offices
Preceded by Ivan Karlović & Ferenc Batthyány	Ban of Croatia, Dalmatia and Slavonia; 1526–1527	Succeeded by Ferenc Batthyány
