= Ferenc Batthyány =

Hungarian magnate and general

- Lord of Németújvár
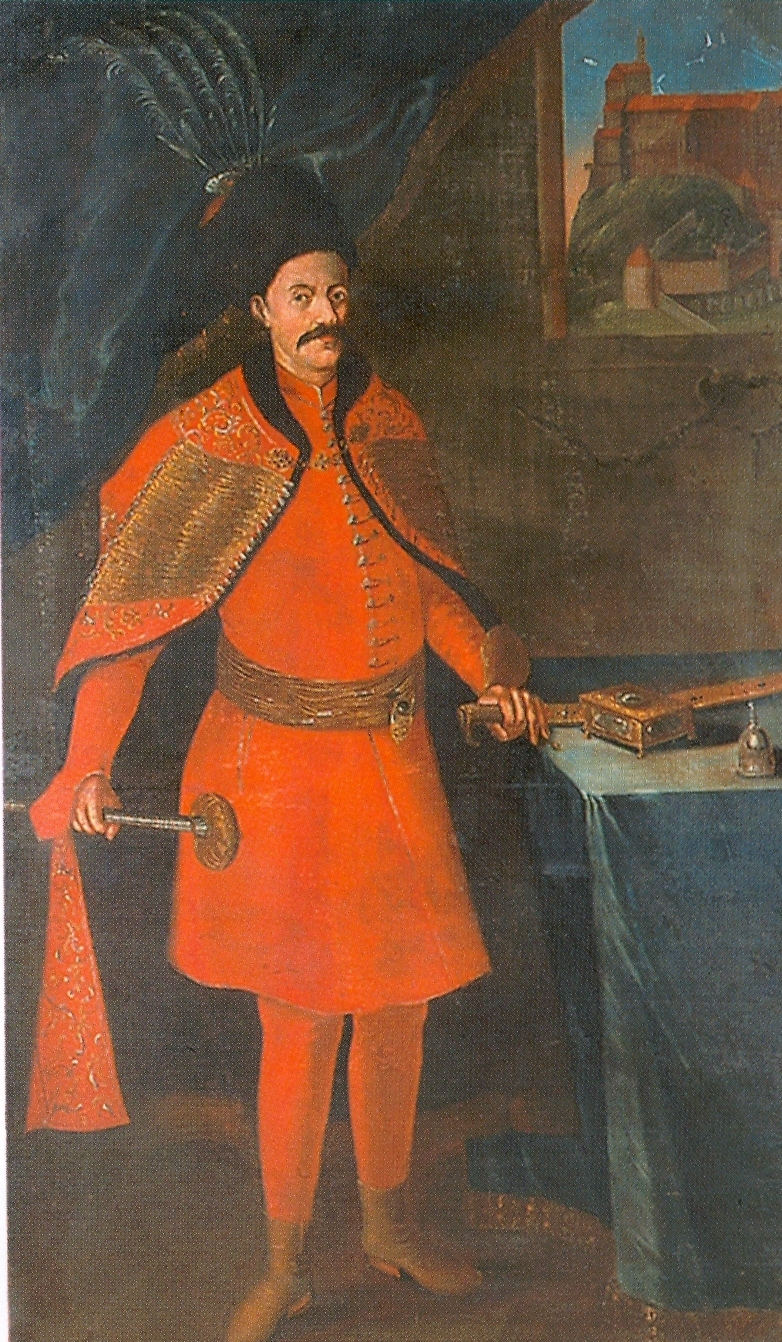
- Portrait of Ferenc Batthyány, c. 1550

Ban of Croatia, Dalmatia and Slavonia
- Reign: 1522–1526; 1527–1531
- Predecessor: Ivan Karlović
- Successor: Simon Erdődy
- Born: 28 October 1497
- Died: 28 November 1566 (aged 69)
- Noble family: Batthyány
- Spouses: Katalin Bánffy; Katarina Cvetković
- Issue: none
- Father: Boldizsár Batthyány
- Mother: Ilona Hermanfi

Ferenc Batthyány de Németújvár (Hungarian: németújvári Batthyány Ferenc, Croatian: Franjo Baćan; 28 October 1497 – 28 November 1566) was a Hungarian magnate and general, member of the prestigious House of Batthyány. He served as Ban of Croatia, Dalmatia and Slavonia from 1522 to 1526 and, as a partisan of King Ferdinand I, from 1527 to 1531.

== Sources ==
- Markó, László (2006). A magyar állam főméltóságai Szent Istvántól napjainkig: Életrajzi Lexikon [Great Officers of State in Hungary from King Saint Stephen to Our Days: A Biographical Encyclopedia] (in Hungarian). Helikon Kiadó. ISBN 963-547-085-1.

Ferenc I House of Batthyány Born: 28 October 1497 Died: 28 November 1566
Political offices
Preceded by Ivan Karlović	Ban of Croatia, Dalmatia and Slavonia alongside Ivan Karlović; 1522–1526	Succeeded by Christoph Frankopan
Preceded by Christoph Frankopan	Ban of Croatia, Dalmatia and Slavonia; 1527–1531	Succeeded by Simon Erdődy
