= List of wars involving Yugoslavia =

This is a list of wars involving Yugoslavia.

== Kingdom of Yugoslavia (1918–1941) ==
Conflict	Combatant 1	Combatant 2	Result
Revolutions and interventions in Hungary (1918–1920); Part of the aftermath of World War I and the Revolutions of 1917–1923	Czechoslovakia (Kingdom of Romania) Romania; State of Slovenes, Croats and Serbs; Kingdom of Serbs, Croats and Slovenes; Republic of Prekmurje; Hutsul Republic Kingdom of Hungary France	Hungarian Republic (Hungarian Soviet Republic) Hungarian SR; Slovak SR	Victory: Collapse of the Hungarian Soviet Republic; Romanian occupation of most of Hungary; Treaty of Trianon; Miklós Horthy takes power as Regent of Hungary
Austro-Slovene conflict in Carinthia (1918–1919); Part of the aftermath of World War I and the creation of Yugoslavia	State of Slovenes, Croats and Serbs: Maister's fighters After unification with Kingdom of Serbia on 1 December 1918: Kingdom of Serbs, Croats and Slovenes: Units from Lower Styria; Units from Ljubljana After 13 February ceasefire: (Kingdom of Yugoslavia) Army of the Kingdom of Serbs, Croats and Slovenes	Republic of German-Austria: Carinthia (Provisional state government of Carinthia) Republic of German-Austria; Carinthia (Provisional state government of Carinthia) Republic of German-Austria; Carinthia (Provisional state government of Carinthia)	Ceasefire: In Carinthian plebiscite southeastern Carinthia votes in favour of joining Austria.; Territorial changes are coordinated by Treaty of Saint-Germain-en-Laye; Majority of southeastern Carinthia is ceded to Austria; Maribor, Meža Valley and Jezersko are ceded to Kingdom of Serbs, Croats and Slovenes.
Christmas Uprising (1919); Part of the aftermath of World War I and the creation of Yugoslavia	Montenegrin Whites; Kingdom of Yugoslavia	(Kingdom of Montenegro) Krsto Popović (Kingdom of Montenegro) Jovan Plamenac	Yugoslav-Whites victory: Continued Guerrilla resistance under Savo Raspopović until 1929
Invasion of Yugoslavia (1941); Part of the Balkans Campaign of World War II	Yugoslavia	Axis: Germany; Italy; Hungary	Axis victory: Continued anti-Axis resistance and beginning of World War II in Yugoslavia; Occupation of Yugoslavia; Partition of Yugoslavia between the Axis; Creation of pro-Axis puppet regimes

== Socialist Federal Republic of Yugoslavia (1940s–1990s) ==
Conflict	Combatant 1	Combatant 2	Result
Eastern Front (World War II) (1941–1945) the European theatre of World War II	Allies: Soviet Union; Poland (Note: The so-called "Anders' Army" (under Władysław Anders), composed of Poles in the USSR and loyal to the London-based Polish government-in-exile, was formed in the early stages of the war, but shortly thereafter moved to the West through Iran. After diplomatic relations between the Polish government and the Soviet Union broke down in 1943, a pro-communist Polish division was formed, which would grow into the First and later Second Polish Armies that fought as part of the Soviet Red Army. Political leadership came from the Polish Committee of National Liberation, which evolved into a Provisional Government rivaling the one in London.) (from 1943); Czechoslovakia (Note: A battalion composed of Czechs and Slovaks in the Soviet Union (refugees, defectors, part of the ethnic minority in the USSR) was established in 1942 and was sent at the front in 1943 and would eventually grow to a Czechoslovak Army Corps, loyal to the Czechoslovak government-in-exile in London, which fought as part of the Red Army.) (from 1943); Yugoslavia (Note: In 1943, the USSR began forming Yugoslav units of the Red Army which began operating in 1944; while for the most part Yugoslav troops fought in the Balkans, a number of Red Army operations involving Yugoslav troops took place in Eastern Europe on the general Eastern Front (e.g. Second Jassy–Kishinev offensive, Operation Spring Awakening)) (from 1944); Former Axis powers: Romania (from 1944); Bulgaria (from 1944); Finland (from 1944); Hungary (Note: By the beginning of 1945, Hungary had had two rivalling governments, the Hungarist puppet government in the Nazi-occupied territory, and the Debrecen government in the Soviet-occupied territory; in January 1945, the USSR began forming small Hungarian volunteer units loyal to the Debrecen government, the largest of which was the Volunteer Regiment of Buda.) (1945); Support: United States (Note: Support provided through Lend-Lease and Arctic convoys); British Empire (Note: Support provided through Arctic convoys, as well as by the presence of No. 151 Wing RAF (with No. 81 Squadron RAF and No. 134 Squadron RAF) on the Eastern Front.); Free France (Note: Support provided by the presence of Fighter Squadron 2/30 Normandie-Niemen as part of 1st Air Army on the Eastern Front.) (from 1943); Mongolia (Note: see Mongolia in World War II); Tuva (Note: see Tuva in World War II)	Axis: Germany; Romania (until 1944); Hungary (Note: Hungary voluntarily participated in the conflict until March 1944, when it submitted to German occupation. In October the same year, a puppet government was installed, which ensured Hungary's participation until the end of the conflict.); Finland (until 1944); Italy (until 1943); Slovakia; Croatia (Note: Croatia never declared war on the Soviet Union and did not consider itself at war with it and only recruited volunteers to the Croatian legions of German and Italian armies and the Luftwaffe; Croatian regiment of the Wehrmacht was the only de jure Croatian unit to fight on the Eastern Front.); Support: Spain (Note: Although Spain officially remained neutral, it provided support to Germany through supplement of essential materials (see Wolfram Crisis) and recruitment of volunteers at the Eastern Front (Blue Division and Blue Squadron); see Spain during World War II) (until 1944) Japan	Victory: Fall of Nazi Germany (concurrently with the Western Front); Beginning of the Cold War and creation of the Eastern Bloc and the Iron Curtain; Beginning of anti-communist insurgencies
Operation Valuable (1949–1956)	Western Bloc: United States; United Kingdom NATO: Italy; West Germany (Note: Formation of the unit Company 4000); Greece; Turkey; Separatists: (Northern Epirus) KEVA Yugoslavia	Hoxha's regime: Communist Albania	Communist Albanian victory: Albanian forces defeated Yugoslav and American forces; Operation failed
Anti-communist insurgencies in Central and Eastern Europe (1944–1960s): Croatian Anti-Communist Resistance in Yugoslavia	Communist Forces: Soviet Union; East Germany; Polish People's Republic; Czechoslovak Socialist Republic; Hungarian People's Republic; Socialist Republic of Romania; People's Republic of Bulgaria; Socialist Federal Republic of Yugoslavia	Anti-Communist Forces: In the Soviet Union: Ukrainian Insurgents (Russia) Russian Insurgents; Polish Insurgents (Estonia) Estonian Insurgents (Latvia) Latvian Insurgents (Lithuania) Lithuanian Insurgents; In the Balkans: (Bulgaria) Bulgarian Insurgents; Serbian Insurgents; Croatian Insurgents; Romanian Insurgents; Other European states: (Germany) German Insurgents; Hungarian Insurgents	Communist Victory: Most Anti-Communist Insurgents were defeated

== Breakup of Yugoslavia (1991–1992) ==
Conflict	Combatant 1	Combatant 2	Result
Ten-Day War (1991)	Yugoslavia	Slovenia	Slovenian victory: Brioni Agreement; Withdrawal of the JNA from Slovenia; Full-scale invasion by the JNA averted; Slovenia gains full independence from Yugoslavia
Croatian War of Independence (1991–1995)	1991–92: (Socialist Federal Republic of Yugoslavia) SFR Yugoslavia (Note: After all former Yugoslav federal republics except Serbia and Montenegro declared independence, the two declared the creation of a new country – the Federal Republic of Yugoslavia – on 27 April 1992, disbanding the JNA soon afterwards. Serb-controlled units of the JNA participated in combat operations throughout 1991 and up to May 1992 in support of the Republic of Serbian Krajina.); SAO Krajina; SAO Eastern Slavonia, Baranja and Western Syrmia; SAO Western Slavonia; 1992–95: Serbian Krajina (Note: Initially, SAO Krajina, SAO Western Slavonia, and SAO Eastern Slavonia, Baranja and Western Syrmia were separate entities and fought individually against the Croatian government. As of December 19, 1991, the SAOs became part of the RSK.); Republika Srpska (Note: In 1992–94, Republika Srpska was intermittently involved in Croatian military operations, mostly through provision of military and other aid to the RSK, occasional air raids launched from Mahovljani airbase near Banja Luka, and most significantly through artillery attacks against a number of cities in Croatia, especially Slavonski Brod, Županja, and Dubrovnik.)	1991–94: Croatia (Note: As determined by the Badinter Arbitration Committee, SFR Yugoslavia dissolved during the war. On 25 June 1991, the Croatian parliament declared the independence of Croatia, following a referendum held in May. The decision was suspended for three months; the declaration became effective on 8 October 1991, and Croatia was no longer part of Yugoslavia.); 1994–95: Croatia; Bosnia and Herzegovina (Note: Bosnia and Herzegovina was particularly significant for the war in late 1994 and in 1995. Pursuant to the Washington Agreement, the Federation of Bosnia and Herzegovina was formed as a subunit of the Republic of Bosnia and Herzegovina (RBiH) representing both Bosnian Croat and Bosniak (Bosnian Muslim) ethnic groups. Most significantly, the Washington Agreement specifically permitted Croatian Army to enter Bosnia and Herzegovina, thereby allowing operations Cincar and Winter '94 against the army of Republika Srpska, outflanking the RSK capital at Knin and creating a new strategic situation before the decisive battles of the war.)	Erdut Agreement: Yugoslav army formally withdrew from Croatia from January 1992 under the Sarajevo Agreement; Croatian forces regained control over most of Republic of Serbian Krajina-held territory; Eastern Slavonia remained under Serbian control until 1996 when it came under effective UN control; Croatian forces advanced into Bosnia and Herzegovina to assist the united Bosnian and Croatian side, which led to the eventual end of the Bosnian War in December 1995; The Croatian government gains control over the vast majority of territory previously held by rebel Serbs, with the remainder coming under UNTAES control. (Note: Three months after the military defeat of the RSK in Operation Storm, the UN-sponsored Erdut Agreement between the Croatian and RSK authorities was signed on 12 November 1995. The agreement provided for a two-year transitional period, later extended by a year, during which the remaining occupied territory of Croatia was to be transferred to control of the Croatian government. The agreement was implemented by UNTAES and successfully completed by 1998.)
Yugoslav campaign in Bosnia (1992)	SFR Yugoslavia (Note: After all former Yugoslav federal republics except Serbia and Montenegro declared independence, the two declared the creation of a new country – the Federal Republic of Yugoslavia – on 27 April 1992.); Republika Srpska	Bosnia and Herzegovina; Herzeg-Bosnia; Croatia	Victory: TOBiH and HV eliminated from Foča, Višegrad, Kupres, Ilidža, Prijedor, Šamac, Zvornik, Čajniče, Doboj, Brčko, Bratunac, and more; Establishment of the VRS; The JNA and HV leave Bosnia due to agreements with the UN; Republika Srpska formed as a self-proclaimed Serb state from Bosnia; Republika Srpska increases its land control from 40% to 52%

== See also ==
- List of wars involving Bosnia and Herzegovina
- List of wars involving Croatia
- List of wars involving Kosovo
- List of wars involving Montenegro
- List of wars involving North Macedonia
- List of wars involving Slovenia

== Bibliography ==
- Безугольный, Алексей Юрьевич; Синицын, Федор Леонидович; Кондратенко, Сергей Юрьевич; Медведев, Максим Валерьевич (2024). Иностранные войска, созданные Советским Союзом для борьбы с нацизмом [Foreign troops created by the Soviet Union to fight Nazism] (in Russian). Центрполиграф. ISBN 978-5-227-10535-6.
- Gosztony, Peter (1991). Stalins Fremde Heere (in German). Bernard & Graefe Verlag. ISBN 978-3-7637-5889-0.
- Tomasevich, Jozo (2001). War and Revolution in Yugoslavia, 1941–1945: Occupation and Collaboration. Stanford: Stanford University Press. ISBN 978-0-8047-3615-2.
- Stahel, David (2018). Joining Hitler's Crusade. Cambridge University Press. ISBN 978-1-316-51034-6.
