= List of wars involving Republika Srpska =

This is a list of wars involving Republika Srpska, a Serb-majority entity of Bosnia and Herzegovina.

== List ==
Conflict	Combatant 1	Combatant 2	Result
1992 Yugoslav campaign in Bosnia (1992)	Bosnia and Herzegovina; Herzeg-Bosnia; Croatia	Yugoslavia; Srpska	Victory: Republika Srpska formed as a separate Serb state from Bosnia; TOBiH and HV eliminated from Foča, Višegrad, Prijedor, Ilidža, Zvornik, Kupres, Doboj, Brčko, Bijeljina, Bosanski Šamac and more; Establishment of the VRS; The JNA leaves Bosnia due to agreements with the UN and were replaced by the VRS
Croatian War of Independence (1992–1995)	Serbian Krajina; Republika Srpska; Support: FR Yugoslavia	Croatia; Republic of Bosnia and Herzegovina	Defeat: Croatian forces regained control over most of Republic of Serbian Krajina-held territory; Croatian forces advanced into Bosnia and Herzegovina to assist the united Bosnian and Croatian armed forces
Bosnian War (1992–1995)	Republika Srpska; Serbian Krajina; Western Bosnia Support: FR Yugoslavia	Republic of Bosnia and Herzegovina; Croatia; Herzeg-Bosnia; NATO (1995)	Dayton Agreement: Internal partition of Bosnia and Herzegovina, Republika Srpska internationally recognized as one of two entities

== See also ==
- List of wars involving Bosnia and Herzegovina
- List of wars involving Serbia
- List of wars involving Yugoslavia
