= List of wars involving Kosovo =

This is a list of wars and conflicts involving the Republic of Kosova (1990s), the Kosovo Liberation Army, the United Nations Interim Administration Mission in Kosovo, and the current partially recognised Republic of Kosovo (since 2008).

Kosovo Albanian victory
Kosovo Albanian defeat
Another result*

*e.g. result unknown or indecisive/inconclusive, result of internal conflict inside Kosovo, status quo ante bellum, or a treaty or peace without a clear result.

Conflict	Combatant 1	Combatant 2	Result
Bosnian Battle of Kosovo (1831)	Bosnian rebels: Local Albanians	Ottoman Empire	Bosnian rebel victory: Some local Albanian fighters joined the Bosnian rebels.
Attack against Mehmed Ali Pasha (1878)	League of Prizren	Ottoman Empire	League of Prizren victory
Serbian invasion of Kosovo (1912)	Ottoman Empire; Kosovo Albanians	Kingdom of Serbia; Montenegro	Serbian victory: Serbian forces captured Kosovo while Montenegrin troops captured Peć; Serbian forces commit massacres against Albanians during the conquest.; Serbian army advance towards Albania
Kachak Movement (1919–1927)	Kachaks; Committee for the National Defence of Kosovo	Kingdom of Yugoslavia; Principality of Albania (from 1922 onwards)	Yugoslav–Zogist victory: Yugoslav forces suppress most of the Kachak resistance.; The Neutral Zone of Junik is eventually re-annexed by Yugoslavia.; Azem Galica is killed in 1924.
Kosovo War (1998–1999)	KLA; FARK NATO: Belgium; Canada; Czech Republic; Denmark; France; Germany; Hungary; Italy; Luxembourg; Netherlands; Norway; Poland; Portugal; Spain; Turkey; United Kingdom; United States; Border clashes: Albania	Federal Republic of Yugoslavia	Kumanovo Agreement: Yugoslav and Serbian forces withdraw from Kosovo.; UN Security Council Resolution 1244 establishes an interim international administration and authorizes an international security presence.
Banjska attack (2023)	Kosovo	Serb militants	Victory: Kosovo Police repel ambush and retake Banjska Monastery.; 1 Kosovo police officer killed, 3 militants killed, 8 arrested, large cache of weapons seized.; Attack linked to group operating from Serbia; condemned internationally.
