= List of wars involving Bosnia and Herzegovina =

This is a list of wars involving Bosnia and Herzegovina and its predecessor states.

== Medieval Bosnia ==
Conflict	Combatant 1	Combatant 2	Result
Bosnian Crusade (1235–1241)	Banate of Bosnia	Kingdom of Hungary	Victory: Status quo ante bellum; Hungarian conquest stopped after First Mongol invasion of Hungary; Hungarian occupation of peripheral parts of Bosnia reversed after the war
War of Hum (1326–1329)	Banate of Bosnia; Republic of Ragusa	Kingdom of Serbia	Victory: Bosnia captures Hum
Bosnian-Serbian war (1350–1351)	Banate of Bosnia	Serbian Empire	Victory: After a failed siege of Bobovac Bosnia regains Hum
Partition of Altomanović (1373)	Kingdom of Bosnia; Kingdom of Hungary; Moravian Serbia	Nikola Altomanović	Victory: Bosnia gains most of Raška
Ottoman conquest of Bosnia and Herzegovina (1386–1592)	Kingdom of Bosnia	Ottoman Empire	Defeat: Incorporation of Bosnia and Herzegovina into the Ottoman Empire
Bosnian–Ragusan war (1403–1404)	Kingdom of Bosnia	Republic of Ragusa	Defeat: Retreat of the Bosnian Army after Ragusans set fire to Šumet and Žrnovnica

== Ottoman Bosnia ==
Conflict	Combatant 1	Combatant 2	Result
Hundred Years' Croatian–Ottoman War (1527–1593)	Ottoman Empire: Eyalet of Bosnia	Habsburg Monarchy: Kingdom of Croatia; Kingdom of Hungary; Duchy of Carniola; Serbian Despotate	Inconclusive: Ottoman Empire conquered areas of Kingdom of Croatia between Vrbas river and Kupa river. Their advance was conclusively halted in 1593 in Third Battle of Sisak. The remaining land remained under the control of Kingdom of Croatia.; Kingdom of Croatia reduced to "Remnants of the remnants"; Croatia joins Habsburg Monarchy; Formation of Military Frontier; Start of the Long Turkish War
Serb Uprising in Herzegovina of 1596–1597 (1596–1597)	Bosnia: Serb Rebels; Bjelopavlići; Drobnjaci; Nikšići; Pivljani	Ottoman Empire	Defeat: Rebellion suppressed by the Ottoman Empire
Austro-Turkish War (1663–1664)	Ottoman Empire: Eyalet of Bosnia	Kingdom of France Holy Roman Empire: Electorate of Saxony; Brandenburg-Prussia; Electorate of Bavaria; Baden-Baden; Swabia; Piedmont-Savoy Kingdom of Hungary Kingdom of Croatia Polish–Lithuanian Commonwealth	Victory: The Ottomans retain Oradea in Transylvania and gain Nové Zámky from the Kingdom of Hungary; Construction of a Habsburg fort along the Waag river, and granted a twenty-year truce.
Croatian-Slavonian-Dalmatian theater in the Great Turkish War (1684–1699)	Ottoman Empire: Eyalet of Bosnia	Habsburg Monarchy: Kingdom of Croatia; Republic of Venice	Defeat: Liberation of Slavonia and Lika and part of the Pounje from the Ottomans; Ottoman Empire pushed out of Central Europe
Austro-Turkish War (1716–1718)	Ottoman Empire: Eyalet of Bosnia	Habsburg Monarchy: (Habsburg monarchy) Serbian Militia; Duchy of Württemberg; Electorate of Bavaria; Republic of Venice; Hajduks; Serbian rebels	Defeat: Treaty of Passarowitz; Banat, Serbia, Oltenia and portions of northern Bosnia were ceded to the Habsburgs
Battle of Banja Luka (1737)	Ottoman Empire: Bosnia	(Habsburg monarchy) Austria	Victory: Ottomans and Bosnians managed to defend Banja Luka
Serbian Revolution (1804–1817)	Ottoman Empire: (Bosnia Eyalet) Ayans; Pashalik of Scutari; Pashalik of Yanina	Serbian rebels	Defeat: Establishment of the autonomous Principality of Serbia
Jančić's Rebellion (1809)	Bosnia: Serb Rebels	Ottoman Empire	Defeat: Rebellion suppressed by the Ottoman Empire
Bosnian Uprising of 1831–1832 (1831–1832)	(Bosnia Eyalet) Bosnian Landlords	Ottoman Empire	Defeat: Rebellion suppressed by the Ottoman Empire; Herzegovina Eyalet was seceded from Bosnia Eyalet; Ayan system was abolished
Priest Jovica's Rebellion (1834)	Bosnia: Christian Rebels; Orthodox Serbs; Catholic Croats	Ottoman Empire	Defeat: Rebellion suppressed by the Ottoman Empire
Herzegovina Uprising of 1852–1862 (1852–1862)	Bosnia: Serb Rebels	Ottoman Empire	Defeat: Great Eastern Crisis; Serbian–Ottoman Wars; Montenegrin–Ottoman War; Rebellion suppressed by the Ottoman Empire
Pecija's First Revolt (1858)	Bosnia: Serb Rebels	Ottoman Empire	Defeat: Rebellion suppressed by the Ottoman Empire
Austro-Hungarian campaign in Bosnia and Herzegovina (1878)	Ottoman Empire: Bosnia	Austria-Hungary	Defeat: Incorporation of Bosnia and Herzegovina into Austria-Hungary

== Austro-Hungarian Bosnia and Herzegovina ==
Conflict	Combatant 1	Combatant 2	Result
World War I (1914–1918)	Germany; Austria-Hungary: Bosnia and Herzegovina; Ottoman Empire; Bulgaria	France; United Kingdom; Russia; United States; Italy; Japan; China; Canada; Australia; New Zealand; India; South Africa; Serbia; Montenegro; Romania; Belgium; Greece; Portugal; Brazil	Defeat: End of the German, Russian, Ottoman, and Austro-Hungarian empires; Formation of new countries in Europe and the Middle East; Transfer of German colonies and regions of the former Ottoman Empire to other powers; Establishment of the League of Nations; Incorporation of Bosnia and Herzegovina into the State of Slovenes, Croats and Serbs (later renamed Yugoslavia)

== Yugoslav Bosnia and Herzegovina ==
Conflict	Combatant 1	Combatant 2	Result
Husino Rebellion (1920)	(Kingdom of Yugoslavia) Miners	Yugoslavia	Defeat: Rebellion suppressed
World War II (1941–1945)	United States; Soviet Union; United Kingdom; China; France; Bulgaria; Poland; Canada; Australia; New Zealand; India; South Africa; Yugoslavia: Bosnian and Herzegovinian Partisans; Greece; Denmark; Norway; Netherlands; Belgium; Luxembourg; Czechoslovakia; Brazil; Mexico	Germany; Japan; Italy; Hungary; Romania; Bulgaria; Croatia; Slovakia; Finland; Thailand; Manchukuo; Mengjiang	Victory: Collapse of the German Reich; Fall of Japanese and Italian Empires; Creation of the United Nations; Emergence of the United States and the Soviet Union as superpowers; Beginning of the Cold War; Bosnia becomes a part of SFRY Yugoslavia as the Socialist Republic of Bosnia and Herzegovina
Cazin Rebellion (1950)	Bosnia and Herzegovina: Civilians	Yugoslavia	Defeat: Rebellion suppressed

== Republic of Bosnia and Herzegovina ==
Conflict	Combatant 1	Combatant 2	Result
Bosnian War (1992–1995)	Bosnia and Herzegovina; Herzeg-Bosnia; Croatia	Srpska; Serbian Krajina; Western Bosnia; FR Yugoslavia	Stalemate: Internal partition of Bosnia and Herzegovina according to the Dayton Accords; Over 101,000 dead, mainly Bosniaks; First genocide in Europe since World War II; Deployment of NATO-led forces to oversee the peace agreement; Establishment of the Office of the High Representative to oversee the civilian implementation of the peace agreement
1992 Yugoslav campaign in Bosnia (1992)	Bosnia and Herzegovina; Herzeg-Bosnia; Croatia	Yugoslavia; Srpska	Defeat: Republika Srpska formed as a separate Serb state from Bosnia; TOBiH and HV eliminated from Foča, Višegrad, Prijedor, Ilidža, Zvornik, Kupres, Doboj, Brčko, Bijeljina, Bosanski Šamac and more; Establishment of the VRS; The JNA leaves Bosnia due to agreements with the UN and were replaced by the VRS
Croat–Bosniak War (1992–1994)	Bosnia and Herzegovina	Herzeg-Bosnia; Croatia	Stalemate: Washington Agreement; Creation of the Federation of Bosnia and Herzegovina
Intra-Bosnian Muslim War (1993–1995)	Bosnia and Herzegovina	Western Bosnia	Victory: AP Western Bosnia got abolished.
Croatian War of Independence (1994–1995)	Croatia; Bosnia and Herzegovina	Serbian Krajina; Srpska	Victory: Yugoslav army formally withdrew from Croatia from January 1992 under the Sarajevo Agreement; Croatian forces regained control over most of Republic of Serbian Krajina-held territory; Croatian forces advanced into Bosnia and Herzegovina to assist the united Bosnian and Croatian side, which led to the eventual end of the Bosnian War in December 1995

== Bosnia and Herzegovina ==
Conflict	Combatant 1	Combatant 2	Result
War in Afghanistan (2001–2021)	Afghanistan; ISAF: United States; United Kingdom; Canada; Australia; New Zealand; Germany; Italy; France; Czech Republic; Netherlands; Turkey; Romania; Georgia; South Korea; Poland; Denmark; Sweden; Norway; Singapore; Bosnia and Herzegovina	(Afghanistan) Taliban al-Qaeda	Withdrawal: Overthrow of the Taliban-governed Islamic Emirate of Afghanistan, December 2001. Taliban continue in the form of an insurgency; Establishment of the coalition-backed Islamic Republic of Afghanistan, January 2004; Killing of Osama bin Laden in Pakistan, May 2011; Gradual "Afghanization" of combat operations during drawdown of ISAF forces; Doha Agreement (2020) between the United States and Taliban beginning withdrawal of United States-led forces, full withdrawal was completed by 30 August 2021; 2021 Taliban offensive culminates in overthrow of the Islamic Republic of Afghanistan and end of fighting, 15 August 2021
Iraq War (2003–2008)	Iraq; Iraqi Kurdistan; MNF–I: United States; United Kingdom; South Korea; Italy; Poland; Australia; New Zealand; Georgia; Ukraine; Netherlands; Spain; Romania; Japan; Denmark; Bulgaria; Bosnia and Herzegovina	SCJL; Naqshbandi Army ISI: al-Qaeda; FIA; Ansar al-Islam; IAI Mahdi Army; Special Groups; Badr Brigades; Kata'ib Hezbollah	Victory: Invasion and occupation of Iraq; Overthrow of Ba'ath Party government; Execution of Saddam Hussein; Emergence of significant insurgency, rise of al-Qaeda in Iraq; Civil war between 2006 and 2008; Subsequent reduction in violence and depletion of al-Qaeda in Iraq in 2008; Establishment of parliamentary democracy and formation of new Shia-led government; Withdrawal of US forces from Iraq in 2011

== See also ==
- List of wars involving Yugoslavia
