= List of wars involving Slovenia =

The following is an incomplete list of wars fought by Slovenia, by its people or regular armies during periods when Slovene states (whether constituent or sovereign) existed, from antiquity to the present day. (Note: For the purposes of this list, the following historic polities will be considered predecessors of the present-day Republic of Slovenia: Duchy of Styria and Duchy of Carniola; Illyrian Provinces; Republic of Prekmurje; State of Slovenes, Croats and Serbs; Kingdom of Serbs, Croats and Slovenes (after 1929: Drava Banovina in the Kingdom of Yugoslavia); Socialist Republic of Slovenia (as part of the Socialist Federal Republic of Yugoslavia).)

The list gives the name, the date, combatants, and the result of these conflicts following this legend:

Slovenian victory
Slovenian defeat
Another result

*e.g. result unknown or indecisive/inconclusive, result of internal conflict inside Slovenia, status quo ante bellum, or a treaty or peace without a clear result.

== 16th century ==
Date	Conflict	Combatant 1	Combatant 2	Result
1515	All-Slovene Peasant Uprising	Holy Roman mercenaries and nobility	Slovenian peasant rebels	Peasant defeat
1573	Croatian–Slovene Peasant Revolt	Croatian, Styrian and Carniolan nobility Uskoks	Croatian and Slovenian peasant rebels	Peasant defeat
1593–1606	Long Turkish War	Holy Roman Empire: Habsburg Monarchy; Saxony; Tuscany; Duchy of Ferrara; Duchy of Mantua; Duchy of Savoy; Kingdom of Hungary; Kingdom of Croatia; Duchy of Carniola; Principality of Transylvania Wallachia Moldavia France Spain Papal States	Ottoman Empire: Crimean Khanate	Inconclusive: Peace of Zsitvatorok

== 17th century ==
Date	Conflict	Combatant 1	Combatant 2	Result
1663–1664	Austro-Turkish War	Holy Roman Empire: Electorate of Saxony; Brandenburg-Prussia; Habsburg monarchy; Electorate of Bavaria; Duchy of Styria; Serbia; Duchy of Carniola; Piedmont-Savoy League of the Rhine: Baden-Baden; Swabia; Kingdom of France; Kingdom of Hungary Kingdom of Croatia	Ottoman Empire: Crimean Khanate	Austria and allies military victory Ottoman commercial and diplomatic victory: Peace of Vasvár
1683–1699	Great Turkish War	Holy Roman Empire and Habsburg Monarchy: Bavaria; Franconia; Saxony; Duchy of Styria; Royal Hungary; Kingdom of Croatia; Polish–Lithuanian Commonwealth Tsardom of Russia Republic of Venice	Ottoman Empire Crimean Khanate	Victory: Treaty of Karlowitz

== 19th century ==
Date	Conflict	Combatant 1	Combatant 2	Result
1803–1815	Napoleonic Wars	French Republic (until 1804) First French Empire (1804–1815): Illyrian Provinces	Austrian Empire; United Kingdom; Russian Empire	Defeat: Congress of Vienna
1848–1849	Hungarian Revolution of 1848	Hungarian nationalists Hungary: Hungarian Slovenes; Rusyns; Zipser Saxons; Hungarian Germans; Banat Bulgarians; Polish legions; German and Viennese legion; Slovenian nationalists and peasants: Radical dissidents of the Zedinjena Slovenija movement (minor confrontations only); Peasant's revolts in Ig and elsewhere	Austria and Allies: Austria: Kingdom of Croatia; Serbian Vojvodina; Serbian volunteers; Habsburg Hungarians; Slovak National Council; Transylvanian Romanians; Ljubljana City Guard Militia; Russian Empire	Defeat, Austro-Russian victory.: Feudalism is abolished in most Slovenian lands
1878	Austro-Hungarian Campaign in Bosnia and Herzegovina in 1878	Austria-Hungary: 17th Infantry Regiment from Carniola	Bosnia Eyalet; Ottoman Empire	Victory: Austro-Hungarian rule in Bosnia and Herzegovina begins

== World War I ==
Date	Conflict	Combatant 1	Combatant 2	Result
1914–1918	World War I	Central Powers: Austria-Hungary; Germany; Ottoman Empire; Bulgaria (1915–18)	Allies: France; British Empire; Russia (1914–17); Italy; United States (1917–18); Serbia and others	Defeat, the Austro-Hungarian Empire is dissolved.: Paris Peace Conference, 1919; Treaty of Saint-Germain-en-Laye (1919)
1918–1919	Austro-Slovene conflict in Carinthia	State of Slovenes, Croats and Serbs (before unification): Maister's fighters; Kingdom of Serbs, Croats and Slovenes (after unification)	German-Austria: Carinthia (Provisional state government of Carinthia)	Ceasefire: In Carinthian plebiscite southeastern Carinthia votes in favour of joining Austria.; Territorial changes are coordinated by Treaty of Saint-Germain-en-Laye.; Majority of southeastern Carinthia is ceded to Austria.; Meža Valley and Jezersko are ceded to Kingdom of Serbs, Croats and Slovenes.
1919	Prekmurje and Yugoslav Clashes against Hungary of 1919	Republic of Prekmurje (before Bela Kun's invasion and the occupation by Hungary) Kingdom of Serbs, Croats and Slovenes: Serbian Units of the Donavska Banovina of the SHS Kingdom (clean-up following the demise of the occupation)	Hungarian Soviet Republic	Compromised victory: Prekmurje Republic is secured by Yugoslav forces after being occupied by Hungary.; Hungarian Soviet Republic is dissolved by the Entente via Romania.

== World War II ==
Date	Conflict	Combatant 1	Combatant 2	Result
1941	World War II — Invasion of Yugoslavia	Yugoslavia	Germany; Italy; Hungary	Axis victory: Occupation of Yugoslavia; Partition of Yugoslavia between the Axis; Creation of pro-Axis puppet regimes
1941–1945	World War II — World War II in Yugoslavia	Partisans Soviet Union (1944–45); Bulgaria (1944–45); Albania (1944–45); United Kingdom (1942–1945); United States (limited involvement, 1943–45)	Germany Italy (until 1943); Croatia^{a} VNS^{a} Hungary; Bulgaria (until 1944); Croatia^{a} VNS^{a} (until 1944); Albania (1943–44); Slovene Home Guard (1943–45); Pećanac Chetniks	Allied victory

== Since World War II ==
Date	Conflict	Combatant 1	Combatant 2	Result
1991	Ten-Day War	Slovenia	Yugoslavia	Decisive Slovenian victory: Brioni Accords; Slovenian independence upheld and recognized by Yugoslavia

== Peacekeeping missions ==
Mission	Start-date	End-date	Location	Troops deployed
KFOR	?	Ongoing	Kosovo	316
