= Serbian invasion of Kosovo (1912) =

Invasion during the First Balkan war

- Part of First Balkan War
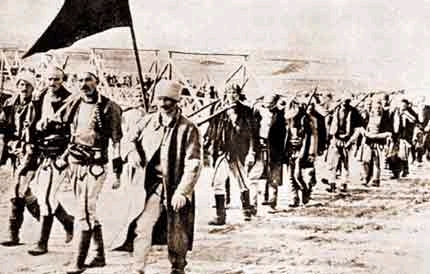
- Albanian volunteers in Kosovo
Date	October and November 1912
Location	Kosovo vilayet, Ottoman Empire
Result	Serbian victory: Serbian army advance towards Albania; Turkish withdrawal
Territorial changes	Serbian forces captured Kosovo while Montenegrin troops captured Peć

Belligerents
Ottoman Empire Independent Albania	Serbia; Montenegro

Commanders and leaders
Isa Boletini; Idriz Seferi; Azem Galica; Bajram Curri	(Kingdom of Serbia) Peter I (Kingdom of Serbia) Božidar Janković (Kingdom of Serbia) Aleksa Žujović (Kingdom of Serbia) Milutin Lazarević (Kingdom of Serbia) Mihailo Živković (Kingdom of Montenegro) King Nikola

Units involved
(Ottoman Empire) Ottoman army; (Ottoman Empire) 1 Battalion; Albanian militans Albanian volunteers Kachaks	Royal Serbian Army (Note: Source for units:); (Kingdom of Serbia) Ibar army; (Kingdom of Serbia) Third Army; (Kingdom of Serbia) Drina division II; (Kingdom of Montenegro) Royal Montenegrin Army (Note: Source for units:); (Kingdom of Montenegro) Vasović brigade; (Kingdom of Montenegro) Kolašin brigade; (Kingdom of Montenegro) Pljevaljska brigade; Serbian Chetniks

Strength
(Ottoman Empire) one battalion containing around 500+ soldiers 15,000 volunteers under Isa Boletini command Several thousand in Luma and Metohija region Unknown in other parts of Kosovo	(Kingdom of Serbia) (Kingdom of Montenegro) Unknown

Casualties and losses
Unknown	Low
- 20,000–25,000 Albanians killed

The Serbian invasion of Kosovo was an invasion by the Royal Serbian army alongside the Royal Montenegrin army with the goal of capturing Kosovo.

== Background ==
Serbia, Montenegro and Greece, to a greater or lesser extent, harbored claims to territories inhabited by Albanians. Serbia's claims, apart from the return of "Old Serbia", i.e. Sandžak, Macedonia, and Kosovo, also included a large part of present-day Albania together with its Adriatic coast, despite the Albanian majority in those areas. Serbia justified these claims by invoking "historical rights".

Plans for Serbia's access to the sea through Albania had been present in Serbian politics for many years. The idea of access to the sea through Albania at that time was supported by many Serbian politicians and intellectuals. Jovan Cvijić believed that the decisions of the Congress of Berlin made "Serbia a landlocked country" and the Serbs a "captured nation," arguing that Serbia must reach the sea to achieve independence. In advocating that policy, Cvijić defended Serbia's right to northern Albania saying:

Serbia must, for the sake of its economic independence, obtain access to the Adriatic Sea and a part of the Albanian coast—either by occupying the territory or by acquiring economic and communication rights in that area. This therefore means the occupation of an ethnographically foreign territory, but one that must be occupied because of particularly important economic interests, indeed because of a vital necessity.

— Jovan Cvijić

Serbia entered the Balkan War without a clear conception of how to permanently and justly resolve the question of the Albanian people in the territories that were the object of its war aims. The Serbian government held the view that the Serbs had lost these regions in their wars with the Turks four centuries earlier and were now just returning them. According to the Serbian government, since the Albanians had fought alongside the Turks against the Serbs, they would have to share the same fate.

== Invasion ==
On 18 October 1912, Serbian King Peter I issued a proclamation stating that his army would bring "freedom, brotherhood, and equality" not only to the Serbs but also to the Albanians.

For the invasion of Kosovo and Albania, the 3rd Serbian Army under the command of General Božidar Janković was designated. The local Serbs of Kosovo welcomed them as liberators. In contrast, the Albanians expected Kosovo to become part of an "autonomous Albania", opposed the occupation of their settlements, and organized volunteer units that offered strong resistance to the advance of Serbian troops. Near Podujevo, about 15,000 volunteers under the command of Albanian commander Isa Boletini resisted the Third Serbian Army that was advancing toward the interior of Kosovo and the Albanian coast.

Guerrilla resistance was encountered during the capture and passage of the Serbian army through Priština, Uroševac, and the village of Crnoljeva near Zborce Han, where a major clash took place between Serbian and Albanian forces. At Dulje and Zborce, several thousand Albanians from the regions of Luma and Metohija desperately tried to defended against the advance of the Serbian army toward Prizren. After four days of fighting, the Albanian resistance was defeated.

After defeating the Albanians, the Serbs captured Prizren around 22 October 1912 and continued their advance toward the Albania and the Adriatic Sea. The Serbian army imposed harsh rule upon the Albanians, who immediately began to resist it. The Serbian General Staff issued an order that any Albanian settlement from which shots were fired should be destroyed. On 30 October, Montenegrin army captured Peć. Serbian army alongside the Montenegrin army captured Đakovica, ending the invasion of Kosovo on 5 November.

== Crimes ==
During the invasion 20,000–25,000 Albanians were killed mostly in Uroševac, Prizren and Đakovica. Serbian troops carried out brutal reprisals against the Albanian civilian population for the killing of Serbian soldiers.

== See also ==
- Albania during the Balkan Wars
- Serbia in the Balkan Wars
