= List of wars involving Montenegro =

The following is a complete list of wars fought by Montenegro since the 19th century. The list gives the name, the date, combatants, and the result of these conflicts according to the legend below.

Montenegrin victory
Montenegrin defeat
Another result*

*e.g. result unknown or indecisive/inconclusive, result of internal conflict inside Montenegro, status quo ante bellum, or a treaty or peace without a clear result.

Date	Conflict	Combatant 1	Combatant 2	Result
1807 - 1814	Adriatic campaign of 1807–1814	United Kingdom; Austria; Montenegro; Greek irregulars	France; Italy; Naples; Ragusa	Coalition victory
1852 - 1853	First Montenegrin-Ottoman War	Montenegro	Ottoman Empire	Montenegrin victory: Without significant territorial changes
1861 - 1862	Second Montenegrin-Ottoman War	Montenegro	Ottoman Empire	Ottoman victory: Convention of Scutari
1876–1878	Third Montenegrin-Ottoman War	Montenegro	Ottoman Empire	Russian victory: Treaty of San Stefano; Treaty of Berlin
1904 - 1905	Russo-Japanese War	Russian Empire; Montenegro	Empire of Japan	Russian defeat: Treaty of Portsmouth; Japan and Montenegro declare a truce in 2006
1912-1913	First Balkan War	Balkan League Bulgaria; Serbia; Greece; Montenegro	Ottoman Empire	Balkan League victory
1913	Second Balkan War	Serbia; Romania; Greece; Montenegro; Ottoman Empire	(Tsardom of Bulgaria (1908–1946)) Kingdom of Bulgaria	Victory: Bulgaria defeated
1914-1916	World War I — Montenegrin Campaign	Montenegro; Serbia	Austria-Hungary	Capitulation: Austrians occupy Montenegro; Unification with Serbia in 1918; Allied victory: Treaty of Versailles
1919	Christmas Uprising	(Kingdom of Yugoslavia) Montenegrin Whites; Kingdom of Serbs, Croats and Slovenes	(Kingdom of Montenegro) Montenegrin Greens; Italy	Victory of Montenegrin Whites
1941-1945	World War II — World War II in Montenegro	Yugoslav Partisans Soviet Union (1944–45); Albania (1944–45); United Kingdom (1942–45); United States (limited involvement, 1943–45)	Nazi Germany Italy (until 1943); Occupied Montenegro; Government of National Salvation Croatia; Montenegrin Chetniks; Occupied Albania (1943–44)	Allied victory: Creation of Socialist Republic of Montenegro within Socialist Federal Republic of Yugoslavia
1991-1992	Croatian War of Independence — Siege of Dubrovnik	Republic of Montenegro Territorial Defence Force (Socialist Federal Republic of Yugoslavia) Yugoslav People's Army (JNA)	Republic of Croatia	Defeat, Croatian victory.
1992	Defense of Foča	Republic of Montenegro Territorial Defence Force (Socialist Federal Republic of Yugoslavia) Yugoslav People's Army (JNA)	Bosnia and Herzegovina	Yugoslav People's Army victory
1999	NATO bombing of Yugoslavia	Federal Republic of Yugoslavia: Republic of Serbia; Republic of Montenegro	NATO	Kumanovo Agreement, end of bombing campaign

== Peacekeeping operations ==
Current Mission	Organization	Country/Region	Nr. of personnel	Period
UNMIL	UN	Liberia	Officers as military observers	2006–2014
EU-NAVFOR	EU	Somalia	8 Members (APVD team)	2010–active
UNFICYP	UN	Cyprus	Officers as military observers	2012–active
RS	NATO	Afghanistan	25 Members (Military troops and medical team)	2014–2021
EUTM	EU	Mali	Officers training and military observers	2014–active
MINURSO	UN	Western Sahara	Officers as military observers	2016–active
KFOR	NATO	Kosovo	Two officers and medical team	2018–active
