= Bosnian–Serbian War (1350–1351) =

Bosnian-Serbian war
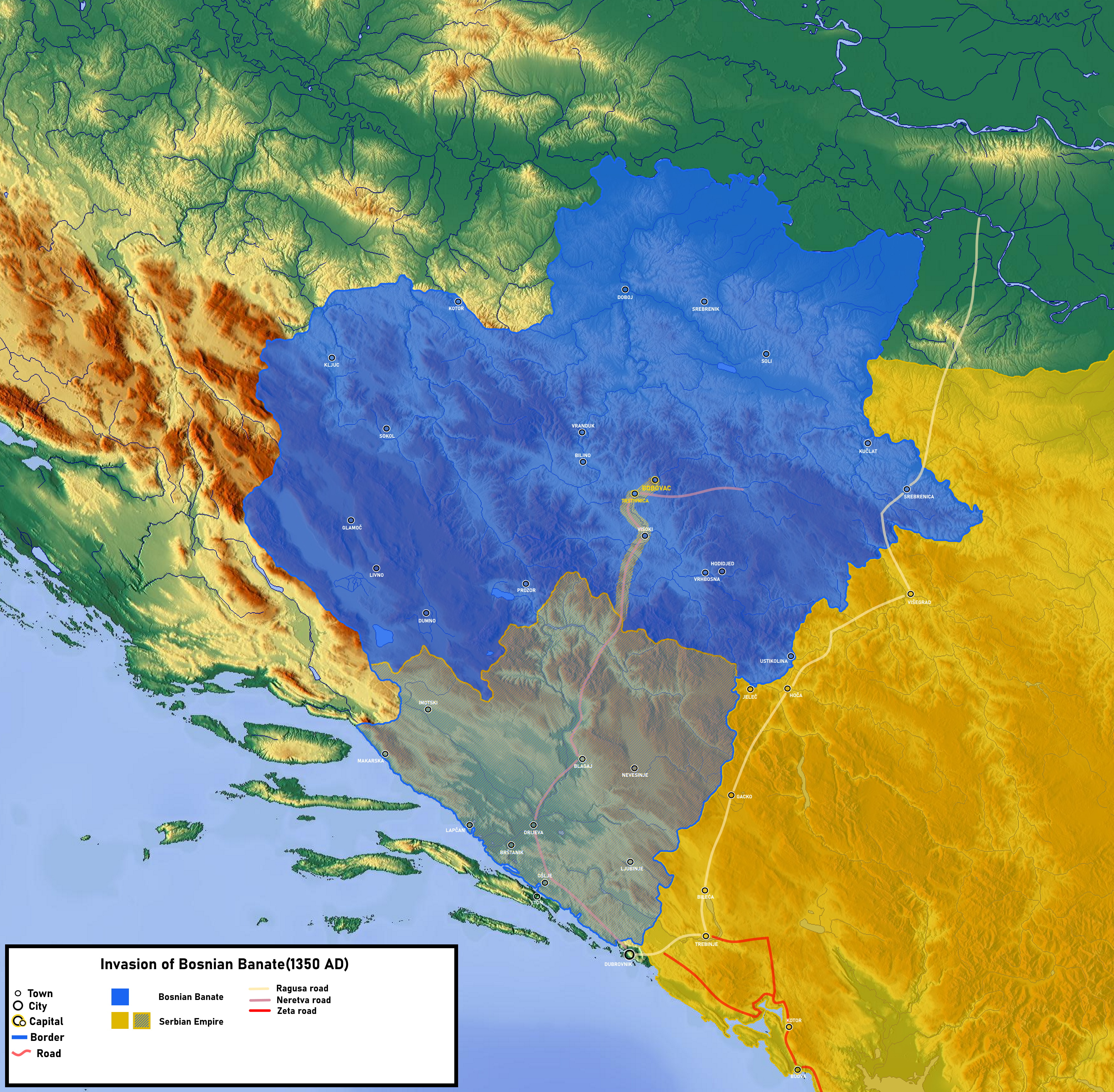
- Serbian invasion of Bosnia in 1350
Date	1350–1351
Location	Zahumlje and Bobovac
Result	Bosnian victory: The Serbian Empire fails to take Hum; The Serbian Empire fails to capture Bobovac

Belligerents
Banate of Bosnia	Serbian Empire

Commanders and leaders
Stjepan II Kotromanić	Stefan Dušan Uroš V

Strength
Unknown	80,000

The Bosnian–Serbian War was a military conflict fought between the Banate of Bosnia and the Serbian Empire from 1350–1351 over the region of Hum (Zahumlje). It was fought shortly from the end of 1350 to the first half of 1351 after the Serbian Emperor Dušan invaded the Banate of Bosnia and besieged the capital Bobovac.

== Background ==
Following the War of Hum the Bosnian ruler Ban Stjepan II Kotromanić invaded the weakened Serbian Kingdom in 1326 and annexed the region of Hum (Zahumlje) and several strategic cities, giving Bosnia sea access to the Adriatic. The region of Zahumlje was ruled by the Serb dukes Branivojevići, notably Branko Branivojević who had fled the region to his King Stefan Dečanski. The region of Hum (Zahumlje) was integrated into the Banate of Bosnia and became a part of the title of the Ban of Bosnia ("Lord of all Bosnian lands, and Soli, and Usora, and Donji Kraji, and the Hum land").

== Outbreak of the war and aftermath ==
The Serbian Emperor Dušan had created a powerful Empire in the Balkans and had sought to expand his demain into Bosnia. All the way to 1346 Dušan had requested the return of Hum to Serbia, all of whom were denied by Stjepan II. In 1350 after Stjepan II's ally King Louis I of Hungary launched a campaign into Naples Emperor Dušan launched an invasion into Bosnia, crossing the Drina river with 50,000 cavalry and 30,000 infantry, numbering a total of 80,000 troops and besieged the Bosnian capital of Bobovac and occupied the Land of Hum all the way to Duvno, burning several villages along the way. Stjepan II had used guerilla warfare against Dušan hiding his men into the Bosnian forests and mountains and blocking off all major roads and bridges. The Republic of Venice had sent deputies in July of 1351 to create a ceasefire between the two sides, fearing that Emperor Dušan would besiege and occupy Stonski Rat (Pelješac) which had been gifted by Stjepan II to The Republic of Dubrovnik (Ragusa) in 1333. The Venetians and Ragusans allegedly had attempted to marry Stjepan's daughter Elizabeth (who had been living in besieged Bobovac) to Emperor Dušan, other believe he had intended to marry her to his son Uroš V Nemanjić. In 1351 due to the duration of the war and further new conflict of Serbia's eastern borders in Macedonia on the border with Byzantium Dušan had withdrawn from Bosnia and Hum and agreed upon peace. As Stjepan II Kotromanić had no male heir his daughter Elizabeth Kotromanić would eventually be married to Louis I, King of Hungary and Poland.
