= List of wars involving North Macedonia =

This is a list of wars involving the Republic of North Macedonia (between 1991 and 2019: Republic of Macedonia).

Conflict	Combatant 1	Combatant 2	Result
Somali Civil War (1992–1995)	United States; United Kingdom; Spain; Saudi Arabia; Malaysia; Pakistan; Italy; India; Greece; Germany; France; Canada; Botswana; Belgium; Australia; Republic of Macedonia	Somalia	Victory: The UN's humanitarian mandate is fulfilled; About 100,000 lives were saved by outside resistance; Civil war is ongoing
2001 insurgency in the Republic of Macedonia (2001)	Republic of Macedonia	National Liberation Army; Albanian National Army	Ohrid Agreement: Macedonian offensive stopped by NATO involvement; The majority of Albanian insurgents agree to disarm in exchange for greater ethnic rights
War in Afghanistan (2001–2014); Part of the war on terror	Afghanistan; ISAF: United States; United Kingdom; Germany; Denmark; Italy; France; Canada; Australia; New Zealand; Armenia; Georgia; Norway; Sweden; Poland; Estonia; Romania; Turkey; Bulgaria; Hungary; Luxembourg; Portugal; Austria; Jordan; Albania; Republic of Macedonia; Iceland; Northern Alliance; United States; United Kingdom; Canada; Australia; Germany	Taliban al-Qaeda; Mujahideen; IMU; Haqqani network ETIM; Islamic Jihad Union; Hezb-e-Islami Gulbuddin; United Tajik Opposition Islamic Emirate of Afghanistan	Defeat: Invasion of Afghanistan; Fall of the Taliban government in Afghanistan; Destruction of al-Qaeda camps; Over two thirds of al-Qaeda's leadership demolished; Occupation of Afghanistan; Establishment of a new Afghan Government and Security Force; Taliban insurgency; Execution of Osama bin Laden; Taliban victory, establishment of the Islamic Emirate of Afghanistan; Islamic State–Taliban conflict
Iraq War (2003–2011); Part of the Iraqi insurgency and war on terror	Iraq; USF–I (2009–2011): United States; MNF–I (2004–2009): United States; United Kingdom; South Korea; Italy; Poland; Australia; Georgia; Ukraine; Estonia; Netherlands; Spain; Denmark; Republic of Macedonia; United States; United Kingdom; Australia; Poland; Peshmerga: KDP; PUK	Ba'ath loyalists Islamic State of Iraq al-Qaeda in Iraq; Mahdi Army; Special Groups; IAI; Ansar al-Sunnah Iraq: Arab volunteers; MEK (until 2003 ceasefire); Ansar al-Islam	Victory: Invasion and occupation of Iraq; Defeat of Ba'ath Party regime and execution of Saddam Hussein; Iraqi insurgency, emergence of al-Qaeda in Iraq, and civil war; Subsequent depletion of Iraqi insurgency, improvements in public security; Establishment of democratic elections and formation of new Shia-led government; Macedonian withdrawal in 2008; U.S.–Iraq Status of Forces Agreement; Withdrawal of U.S. forces from Iraq; War on ISIL; Iraqi Civil War
