= List of wars involving Croatia =

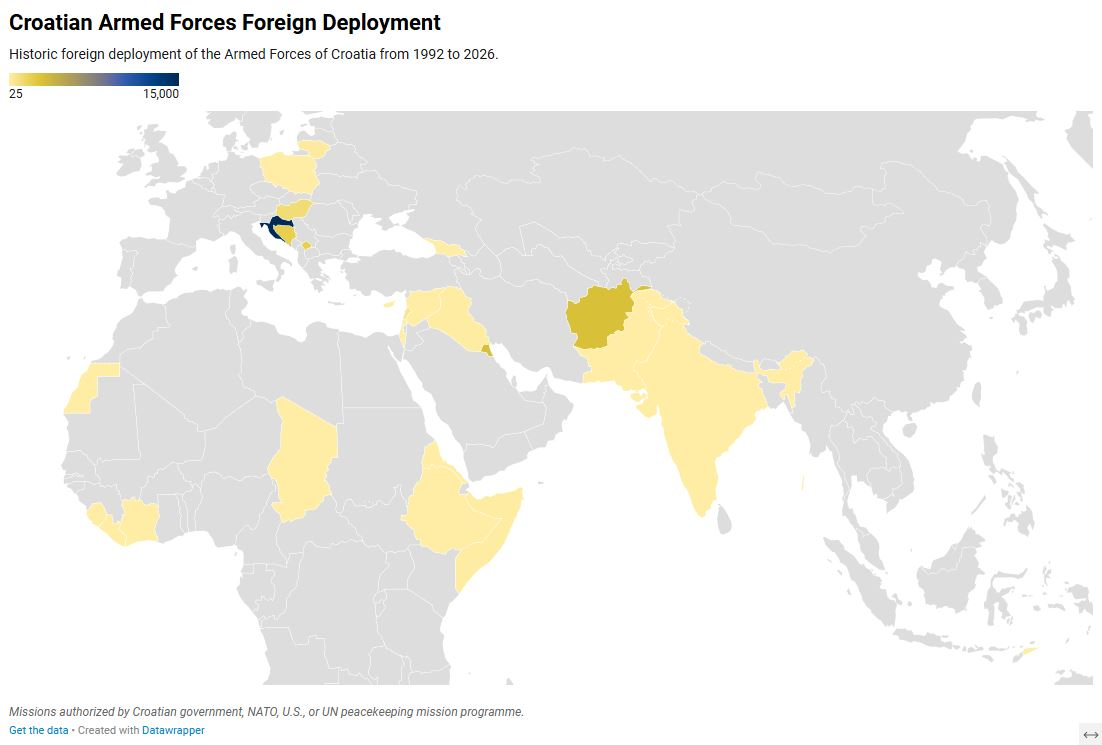
Foreign deployment of the Croatian Armed Forces abroad in military and peacekeeping missions.

This list of wars involving Croatia is expansive, spanning the nation's extended history to the 21st century. It encompasses armed conflicts involving ethnic Croats, Croatian citizens, and regular armies predating statehood since the Early Middle Ages. Many of these armed conflicts are reflected in the military history of Croatia.

The Armed Forces of Croatia combine the modern-day nation's Army, Navy, and Air Force, as well as their Special Forces. This list reflects direct Croatian military involvement – in both combat and non-combat roles – within armed conflicts. In the latter capacity, military advisory and training missions have intermittently devolved into unofficial combat activity or battlefield deaths. Modern Croatia has never formally declared war since independence.

For the criteria of what may be permitted on this list, see notes section.

== Key ==
Victory
Defeat
Result of civil or internal conflict
A treaty or peace without a clear result, status quo ante bellum, an unknown or indecisive result
Ongoing conflict

== Duchy of Croatia (7th century–925) ==
Date	Conflict	Combatant 1	Combatant 2	Result
c. 620s–630s	White Croat conquest of Dalmatia	White Croats	Avar Khaganate	Victory
7th century–925	Croatian–Venetian wars	Narentines; Duchy of Croatia	Republic of Venice	Intermittent victories and defeats
788-803	Avar wars	Duchy of Croatia	Avar Khaganate	Victory
799	Siege of Trsat	Duchy of Croatia	Francia	Victory
846–848	Croatian-Byzantine War	Duchy of Croatia	Zadar under the Byzantine strategos	Victory
854	First Bulgarian-Croatian War	Duchy of Croatia	First Bulgarian Empire	Peace agreement
871	Conquest of Bari	Holy Roman Empire; Lombard principalities Duchy of Croatia (Croatian fleet)	Emirate of Bari	Victory
895-925	Hungarian invasions of Europe	Lower Pannonia Duchy of Croatia	Hungarian tribes	Defeat: Hungarians fought Croatia, although it was not a primary target of their raids; The chiefs of Pannonian Croatia sought aid against the Hungarians from Tomislav

== Kingdom of Croatia (925–1102) ==
Date	Conflict	Combatant 1	Combatant 2	Result
c. 925	Hungarian Invasions of Croatia	Kingdom of Croatia	Hungarian tribes	Victory
925–931	Second Croatian-Bulgarian War	Kingdom of Croatia	First Bulgarian Empire	Victory
968–1018	Byzantine conquest of Bulgaria	Byzantine Empire; Kievan Rus' (until 969); Kingdom of Hungary; Kingdom of Croatia Principality of Duklja	First Bulgarian Empire; Kievan Rus' (970–971); Pechenegs	Victory
997–1000	Third Croatian-Bulgarian War	Kingdom of Croatia	First Bulgarian Empire	Victory
c. 1040–1185	Byzantine–Norman wars	Kingdom of France; Kingdom of Sicily; Lombard duchies Papal States Kingdom of Croatia Raška and Duklja	Byzantine Empire; Republic of Venice; Holy Roman Empire	Victory
1091–1102	War of the Croatian Succession	Kingdom of Croatia: Allies of king Petar Snačić	Kingdom of Hungary: Allies among Croatian nobles in Slavonia	Defeat: Death of king Petar Snačić; Croatia enters into a personal union with the Kingdom of Hungary

== Croatia in personal union with Hungary (1102–1527) ==
Date	Conflict	Combatant 1	Combatant 2	Result
1108	Hungarian war with the Holy Roman Empire	Kingdom of Hungary Kingdom of Croatia	Holy Roman Empire; Duchy of Bohemia	Victory
1108–1126	Hungarian-Bohemian wars	Kingdom of Hungary Kingdom of Croatia	Duchy of Bohemia	Peace agreement
1115–1119	Croatian-Venetian War	Kingdom of Hungary Kingdom of Croatia	Republic of Venice	Defeat
1123	Stephen II's intervention in the Kievan Rus' internal conflict	Kingdom of Hungary; Iaroslav Sviatopolkovich	Kievan Rus'	Hungarian withdrawal
1124–1125	Croatian-Venetian War	Kingdom of Hungary Kingdom of Croatia	Republic of Venice	Defeat
1127–1129	Byzantine-Hungarian War	Kingdom of Hungary; Grand Principality of Serbia	Byzantine Empire	Peace agreement
1132	Hungarian-Polish War	Kingdom of Hungary; Margraviate of Austria	Kingdom of Poland	Victory
1136–1137	Béla II's Balkan campaigns against Venice and the Byzantine Empire	Kingdom of Hungary Kingdom of Croatia	Byzantine Empire Republic of Venice	Victory
1146	German-Hungarian War	Kingdom of Hungary	Duchy of Bavaria; Margraviate of Austria	Victory
1149–1152	Géza II's intervention in the conflict between the Principality of Galicia and Kievan Rus'	Kingdom of Hungary; Kievan Rus'	Principality of Galicia	Peace agreement
1148–1155	Hungarian-Byzantine wars	Kingdom of Hungary; Grand Principality of Serbia	Byzantine Empire	Ceasefire
1162–1165	Hungarian civil war between Stephen III and his uncles Ladislaus and Stephen	Kingdom of Hungary; Holy Roman Empire	Ladislaus and Stephen's army Byzantine Empire	Stephen III's victory
1180–1185	Hungarian-Byzantine war	Kingdom of Hungary	Byzantine Empire	Victory
1188–1189	Béla III's military campaign against Galicia	Kingdom of Hungary	Principality of Galicia	Victory
1197–1199	Civil war between Emeric king and his brother Andrew II	Kingdom of Hungary Kingdom of Croatia	Andrew II's army	Emeric's victory
1201–1205	Emeric's Balkan wars	Kingdom of Hungary Kingdom of Croatia	Second Bulgarian Empire; Banate of Bosnia Grand Principality of Serbia	Croatian/Hungarian victories
1202–1204	Fourth Crusade	Kingdom of Hungary Kingdom of Croatia	Crusaders of the Fourth Crusade; Republic of Venice	Defeat
1217–1218	Andrew II's participation in the Fifth Crusade	Kingdom of Hungary Kingdom of CroatiaArchduchy of Austria; Latin Empire	Ayyubids	Croatian/Hungarian withdrawal
1235–1241	Bosnian Crusade	Coloman of Galicia	Banate of Bosnia	Status quo ante bellum
1241–1242	First Mongol invasion of Hungary	Kingdom of Hungary Kingdom of Croatia	Mongols	Mongol withdrawal
1243	Venetian War for Zadar	Kingdom of Hungary Kingdom of Croatia	Republic of Venice	Defeat
1250–1278	Hungarian-Bohemian wars	Kingdom of Hungary; Holy Roman Empire	Kingdom of Bohemia; Duchy of Austria	Victory
1264–1265	Internal conflict between Béla IV and his son Stephen V	Kingdom of Hungary Kingdom of Croatia	Stephen V's army	Stephen V's victory: Stephen V gets Eastern Hungary as a duchy
1268	Mačva War	Béla IV of Hungary	Kingdom of Serbia	Peace agreement
1272–1279	Feudal anarchy	Ladislaus IV king of Hungary; Csák family	Kőszegi family Gutkeled family	Royal victory
1277	Stefan Dragutin-Stefan Uroš I conflict	Stefan Dragutin; Kingdom of Hungary	Stefan Uroš I	Stefan Dragutin's victory
1277	Hungary's war with the Vlach ruler Litovoi	Kingdom of Hungary	Litovoi's army	Victory
1282	Cuman uprising	Kingdom of Hungary	Cumans	Victory
1285–1286	Second Mongol invasion of Hungary	Kingdom of Hungary	Golden Horde	Victory
1291	German-Hungarian War	Kingdom of Hungary	Holy Roman Empire	Victory
1292–1300	Andrew III's war with the Kőszegi family	Kingdom of Hungary	Kőszegi family	Andrew III's victory
1301–1308	Hungarian interregnum, struggles for the country's throne	Charles of Anjou; Kingdom of Croatia Duchy of Austria; Máté Csák's army László Kán's army	Kingdom of Bohemia; Duchy of Bavaria; Kőszegi family	Victory: Charles I becomes Croatian and Hungarian king
1310–1321	Charles I's wars for centralizing power against Croatian and Hungarian aristocracy	Kingdom of Hungary	Máté Csák: Aba family; Borsa family; Apor family; Kőszegi family	Royal victory: Centralization of the Hungarian Kingdom
1322	Feudal and dynastic conflicts in Croatia	Coalition of Croatian noblemen and Dalmatian coastal towns with support of the royal forces of king Charles I Robert	Mladen II Šubić of Bribir and his allies	Defeat of Mladen II
1322–1337	Hungarian-Austrian War	Kingdom of Hungary	Duchy of Austria; Holy Roman Empire; Kőszegi family Babonić family	Status quo ante bellum
1321–1324	Hungarian-Serbian War	Kingdom of Hungary; Kingdom of Bosnia; Stephen Vladislav II of Syrmia	Kingdom of Serbia	Defeat
1330	Hungarian-Wallachian War	Kingdom of Hungary	Wallachia	Hungarian defeat at the battle of Posada
1347–1349 1350–1352	Neapolitan campaigns of Louis the Great	Kingdom of Hungary Kingdom of Croatia	Kingdom of Naples	First campaign: Croatian/Hungarian victory Second campaign: Status quo ante bellum
1345–1358	Croatian-Venetian War	Kingdom of Hungary Kingdom of Croatia	Republic of Venice	Victory: Treaty of Zadar
1345	Hungarian war with the Golden Horde for Moldavia	Kingdom of Hungary	Golden Horde	Victory: Liberation of Moldavia under Mongol rule
1360–1369	Louis I's Balkan wars against Serbia, Bulgaria, Wallachia and Bosnia	Kingdom of Hungary	Serbian Empire; Second Bulgarian Empire Wallachia; Kingdom of Bosnia	Temporary Hungarian victories
1372–1381	War of Chioggia	Padua; Kingdom of Hungary; Republic of Genoa; Duchy of Austria	Republic of Venice; Milan; Ottoman Empire; Kingdom of Cyprus	Paduan military victory, practically status quo ante bellum
1384–1394	Civil war between a part of the Hungarian nobility and Mary, Queen of Hungary and Emperor Sigismund	Kingdom of Hungary	Horváti family Kingdom of Naples	Emperor Sigismund's victory
1366–1526	Ottoman–Hungarian wars	Kingdom of Hungary Kingdom of Croatia Polish–Lithuanian Commonwealth Wallachia Moldavia Serbian Despotate	Ottoman Empire; Moravian Serbia	Defeat: Final defeat at the Battle of Mohács; Hungarian Kingdom partitioned; War continues between the Habsburgs and Ottomans
1411–1433	Croatian-Venetian War	Kingdom of Hungary; Kingdom of Croatia Duchy of Milan	Republic of Venice	Defeat: Dalmatia becomes part of Venice
1419–1434	Hussite Wars	Holy Roman Empire; Kingdom of Hungary	Hussites	Victory
1428–1432	War of the South Danube	Kingdom of Hungary; Wallachia; Grand Duchy of Lithuania	Ottoman Empire	Ceasefire
1437–1442	Hungarian-Ottoman border conflicts, Ottoman raids in Southern Hungary and Transylvania	Kingdom of Hungary	Ottoman Empire	Victory
1440–1442	Civil war between Wladyslaw I and Ladislaus	Kingdom of Poland; Hungarian nobles	Cillei family and other Hungarian nobles	Peace agreement: Wladyslaw is accepted as Hungarian king
1443–1444	Long campaign	Kingdom of Hungary	Ottoman Empire	Hungarian withdrawal
1458–1459	Matthias I's war with Ján Jiskra	Kingdom of Hungary	Jiskra's soldiers	Royal victory
1458–1465	War in Bosnia	Kingdom of Hungary	Ottoman Empire	Inconclusive: A part of Bosnia is occupied by the Ottoman Empire
1471–1476	Matthias Corvinus' intervention in the Moldovian-Ottoman War	Kingdom of Hungary; Moldavia	Ottoman Empire	Inconclusive: After initial Hungarian and Moldavian victories, Hungary stopped supporting Moldavia; Stephen III of Moldavia becomes a vassal of the Ottoman Empire
1480–1481	Ottoman invasion of Otranto	Kingdom of Naples; Crown of Aragon; Kingdom of Hungary	Ottoman Empire	Victory
1482–1488	Austrian-Hungarian War	Kingdom of Hungary	Holy Roman Empire	Victory
1490–1491	War of the Hungarian Succession	Kingdom of Bohemia	Holy Roman Empire; Kingdom of Poland (the two countries were not allies)	Inconclusive: The Bohemian king, Wladislaus won over the Polish army and got the Hungarian throne; Wladislaus is defeated by the Holy Roman Empire, which reconquered Vienna and the other parts of Austria
1492–1493	The Black Army's uprising	Kingdom of Hungary	Black Army	Victory: Destruction of the Black Army
1514	Peasant revolt led by György Dózsa	Kingdom of Hungary	Peasant rebels	Revolt suppressed
1493–1593	Hundred Years' Croatian–Ottoman War	Until 1526: Kingdom of Croatia; Kingdom of Hungary From 1527: Habsburg monarchy	Until 1526: Ottoman Empire From 1527: Ottoman Empire: Eyalet of Bosnia	Inconclusive: Expansion of the Ottoman Empire in Europe was stopped in Battle of Sisak 1593.

== Croatia within the Habsburg Monarchy (1527–1918) ==
Date	Conflict	Combatant 1	Combatant 2	Result
1573	Croatian–Slovene Peasant Revolt	Croatian, Styrian and Carniolan nobility Uskoks	Croatian and Slovenian peasant rebels	Peasant defeat
1593–1606	Long Turkish War	Holy Roman Empire: Habsburg monarchy; Electorate of Saxony; Kingdom of Hungary; Kingdom of Croatia; Transylvania; Wallachia; Moldavia; Spain; Zaporozhian Cossacks; Serbian Hajduks; Papal States; Tuscany; Knights of St. Stephen; Duchy of Ferrara; Duchy of Mantua; Duchy of Savoy	Ottoman Empire; Crimean Khanate; Nogai Horde	Inconclusive: Peace of Zsitvatorok
1618–1648	Thirty Years' War	Imperial alliance: Habsburg Monarchy; (Spain) Spanish Empire; Bavaria; Catholic League; Croatian cavalry in the Catholic League	Anti-Imperial alliance: France; Sweden; Dutch Republic; Hesse-Kassel	Peace of Westphalia: Some sources claim that Swedish Emperor Gustavus Adolphus was killed by Croatian cavalrymen during the Battle of Lützen
1663–1664	Austro-Turkish War	Holy Roman Empire: Electorate of Saxony; Brandenburg-Prussia; Habsburg monarchy; Electorate of Bavaria; Piedmont-Savoy Kingdom of Croatia Kingdom of Hungary; League of the Rhine: Baden-Baden Swabia Kingdom of France	Ottoman Empire: Crimean Khanate; Moldavia; Wallachia	Austria and allies military victory Ottoman commercial and diplomatic victory: Peace of Vasvár
1683–1699	Great Turkish War	Holy Roman Empire Polish–Lithuanian Commonwealth; Tsardom of Russia: Cossack Hetmanate; Kingdom of Croatia; Kingdom of Hungary; Republic of Venice; Duchy of Mantua; Spanish Empire; Prince-Bishopric of Montenegro; Serbian rebels Greek rebels Bulgarian rebels	Ottoman Empire: Crimean Khanate; Moldavia; Principality of Upper Hungary (until 1685); Wallachia; Transylvania	Victory: Treaty of Karlowitz; Most of the territories were regained, except for lands known as Turkish Croatia
1716–1718	Austro-Turkish War	Habsburg monarchy: Croats in the Habsburg Imperial Army	Ottoman Empire	Victory: Treaty of Passarowitz
1788–1791	Austro-Turkish War	Habsburg monarchy: Croats in the Habsburg Imperial Army	Ottoman Empire	Inconclusive: Treaty of Sistova
1803–1815	Napoleonic Wars	Austrian Empire: Croats in the Imperial Austrian Army	French Republic (1792–1804); First French Empire (1804–1815): Various client states; Croats of the Grande Armée	Victory: Congress of Vienna
1848–1849	Hungarian Revolution of 1848	Austrian Empire: Kingdom of Croatia; Serbian Vojvodina; Serbian volunteers; Pro-Habsburg Hungarians; Slovak National Council; Transylvanian Romanians; Supreme Ruthenian Council; Czech volunteers; Bohemian and Moravian volunteers; Transylvanian Saxons; Russian Empire	Kingdom of Hungary: Legions of the revolutionaries from German states; Polish legions; Italian legions; Viennese legion; Hungarian Germans; Hungarian Slovenes; Pro-Hungarian Slovaks; Pro-Hungarian Romanians; Rusyns; Zipser Saxons; Croats from Western Hungary and Muraköz; Šokac and Bunjevac people; Banat Bulgarians; Hungarian Jews	Victory: Surrender at Világos; Josip Jelačić was instrumental in defeating the Hungarians
1866	Third Italian War of Independence	Principality of Liechtenstein Austrian Empire: Kingdom of Dalmatia (Croatian sailors)	Kingdom of Italy	Military Victory, Diplomatic Defeat: Austria cedes Venetia to France, and France than cedes it to Italy
1878	Austro-Hungarian campaign in Bosnia and Herzegovina	Austria-Hungary: Kingdom of Croatia-Slavonia; Kingdom of Dalmatia	Bosnia Vilayet; Ottoman Empire (not openly)	Victory: Occupation of Bosnia and Herzegovina
1899–1901	Boxer Rebellion	Eight-Nation Alliance: (British Empire) United Kingdom; Russia; Japan; France; United States; Germany (Kingdom of Italy) Italy; Austria-Hungary: Kingdom of Croatia-Slavonia; Kingdom of Dalmatia	Boxers; Qing dynasty	Victory
1914–1918	World War I	Central Powers: Austria-Hungary: Kingdom of Croatia-Slavonia; Kingdom of Dalmatia; Germany; Ottoman Empire; Bulgaria	Allied Powers: Russia; France; British Empire; Serbia; Montenegro; Belgium; Japan; Italy; Portugal; Romania; United States; Hejaz; Greece; Brazil (Thailand) Siam	Defeat

== Kingdom of Yugoslavia, WWII and post-war Yugoslavia (1918–1991) ==
Date	Conflict	Combatant 1	Combatant 2	Result
1918-1920	Revolutions and interventions in Hungary	Czechoslovakia Kingdom of Romania Kingdom of Serbs, Croats and Slovenes Republic of Prekmurje Kingdom of Hungary France	Hungarian Republic Hungarian SR Slovak SR	Victory: Hungarian defeat; Collapse of the Hungarian Soviet Republic; Partial Romanian occupation of Hungary; Treaty of Trianon; Miklós Horthy takes power as Regent of Hungary
1918–1919	Austro-Slovene conflict in Carinthia	State of Slovenes, Croats and Serbs (Kingdom of Yugoslavia) Kingdom of Serbs, Croats and Slovenes (from 1 December 1918)	Republic of German-Austria Carinthia First Austrian Republic (from 1919)	Ceasefire: In Carinthian plebiscite southeastern Carinthia votes in favour of joining Austria; Territorial changes are coordinated by Treaty of Saint-Germain-en-Laye
1919	Christmas Uprising	(Kingdom of Yugoslavia) Montenegrin Whites; Kingdom of Serbs, Croats and Slovenes	(Kingdom of Montenegro) Montenegrin Greens; Kingdom of Italy	Victory: The uprising was put down
1920-1921	Koplik War	Kingdom of Serbs, Croats and Slovenes	Principality of Albania	Mixed results: Yugoslavs are forced to withdraw due to international pressure; United Kingdom insists on slight adaptations in the regions of Debar, Prizren and Kastrati in the interest of Yugoslavia
1921	Albanian-Yugoslav Border War	Kingdom of Serbs, Croats and Slovenes Kingdom of Greece Republic of Mirdita	Principality of Albania	Peace brokered by the League of Nations: Recognition of Albanian sovereignty and borders; Mirdita rebels disbanded
1941	Axis Invasion of Yugoslavia	Kingdom of Yugoslavia: Banovina of Croatia	Germany; Italy; Bulgaria; Hungary	Defeat: Occupation of Yugoslavia; Partition of parts of Yugoslavia between the Axis; Creation of pro-Axis puppet regimes in Serbia and Montenegro; Axis establish the puppet state Independent State of Croatia
1941–1945	World War II in Yugoslavia	Allies: Soviet Union; Poland; Czechoslovakia (from 1943) (Tuvan People's Republic) Tuva (until 1944); Romania (from 1944) Bulgaria (from 1944); Finland (from 1944) (Democratic Federal Yugoslavia) Yugoslav Partisans Democratic Federal Yugoslavia (1943–1945): (Socialist Republic of Croatia) Federal State of Croatia (1943–1945); Aerial role only: Free France (1943–1945); United Kingdom (1941); United States (1944)	Axis powers: Nazi Germany; Romania (until 1944); Hungary; Italy (until 1943); Bulgaria (until 1944); Axis puppet states: Slovakia Government of Nation Salvation; Independent State of Croatia Co-belligerents: Finland (until 1944)	Victory: End of World War II in Europe (concurrently with the Western Front); Soviet Union occupies Eastern Europe and establishes pro-Soviet Communist governments in countries including Bulgaria, Czechoslovakia, Hungary, Poland, Romania, and East Germany; SR Croatia becomes a federal constituent of the Federal People's Republic of Yugoslavia; Beginning of the Cold War and the creation of the Iron Curtain; The beginning of the Greek Civil War; Borders of Poland adjusted
1946-1949	Greek Civil War	(Kingdom of Greece) Provisional Democratic Government of Greece Supported by: Soviet Union People's Socialist Republic of Albania Federal People's Republic of Yugoslavia: (Socialist Republic of Croatia) People's Republic of Croatia	Kingdom of Greece Supported by: United Kingdom; United States	Defeat: Hellenic Army victory; 100,000 ELAS fighters and communist sympathizers serving in DSE ranks were imprisoned, exiled, or executed
1948-1954	Albanian–Yugoslav conflict	Federal People's Republic of Yugoslavia: (Socialist Republic of Croatia) People's Republic of Croatia	People's Socialist Republic of Albania	Defeat: Albanian victory
1975–2002	Angolan Civil War	MPLA SWAPO MK Cuba East Germany Soviet Union Socialist Federal Republic of Yugoslavia: Socialist Republic of Croatia	UNITA FNLA FLEC South Africa Zaire	Victory: Withdrawal of all foreign forces in 1989; Dissolution of the armed forces of FNLA; Participation of UNITA and FNLA, as political parties, in the new political system, from 1991 and 1992 onward, but civil war continues; Immediate peace agreement and dissolution of the armed forces of UNITA in 2002; Resistance of FLEC continued beyond 2002

== Republic of Croatia (1991–present) ==
Date	Conflict	Combatant 1	Combatant 2	Result
1991–1995	Croatian War of Independence	Republic of Croatia Supported by: Republic of Bosnia and Herzegovina (1994–1995)	(Socialist Federal Republic of Yugoslavia) SFR Yugoslavia (1991–1992) Republic of Serbian Krajina; Republika Srpska Supported by: (Federal Republic of Yugoslavia) FR Yugoslavia (1992–1995)	Victory: Croatian forces regain control over most of RSK-held Croatian territory; Croatian forces advance into Bosnia and Herzegovina which leads to end of the Bosnian War
1992–1995	Bosnian War	Republic of Bosnia and Herzegovina Croatian Republic of Herzeg-Bosnia Republic of Croatia Supported by: NATO (1995 Operation Deliberate Force)	(Socialist Federal Republic of Yugoslavia) SFR Yugoslavia (until 27 April 1992) AP Western Bosnia; Republika Srpska; Republic of Serbian Krajina Supported by: (Federal Republic of Yugoslavia) FR Yugoslavia	Stalemate: Partition of Bosnia and Herzegovina with Dayton Accords; Over 38,200 civilian casualties, mainly from the Bosnian Muslim ethnic group; Almost 57,700 soldiers killed; First case of genocide in Europe since World War II; Deployment of NATO-led forces
1992–1994	Croat-Bosniak War	Croatian Republic of Herzeg-Bosnia Supported by: Republic of Croatia	(Bosnia and Herzegovina) Republic of Bosnia and Herzegovina Supported by: Bosnian mujahideen Croatian Defence Forces (until 1993)	Inconclusive: Washington Agreement; Creation of the Federation of Bosnia and Herzegovina
1993-1995	Intra-Bosnian Muslim War	Republic of Croatia Republic of Bosnia and Herzegovina	AP Western Bosnia Republika Srpska	Victory: Republic of Bosnia forces regain control
2001–2021	War in Afghanistan	Islamic Republic of Afghanistan NATO: Republic of Croatia in the International Security Assistance Force (ISAF) and Resolute Support Mission (RS)	ISAF phase (from 2001): Taliban Islamic Jihad Union Haqqani network (from 2002) al-Qaeda RS phase (from 2015): ISIL-KP Lashkar-e-Jhangvi Pakistani Taliban	Defeat: Largest deployment of Croatian forces; Fall of the Taliban government in Afghanistan; Destruction of al-Qaeda camps; Croatian capture of Taliban rebels; Taliban insurgency; Execution of Osama bin Laden; Taliban victory, establishment of the Islamic Emirate of Afghanistan
2003–2011	Iraq War	MNF–I: (2003–2009) United States Supported by: Republic of Croatia among others (NATO) NTM-I: (2004–2011) NATO: Republic of Croatia	(2003–2011) Al-Qaeda in Iraq Islamic Army in Iraq Islamic State of Iraq Mahdi Army (Ba'athist Iraq) Naqshbandi Army Hamas of Iraq Jaysh al-Mujahideen 1920 Revolution Brigades Jamaat Ansar al-Sunna	Inconclusive: Capture and execution of Saddam Hussein; Failed search for weapons of mass destruction; Withdrawal of U.S. forces from Iraq in 2011; rise of the Islamic State of Iraq and the Levant (ISIL)
2013–2017	War in Iraq	Iraq CJTF–OIR: United States; Republic of Croatia; among others	Islamic State of Iraq and the Levant (ISIL)	U.S.-allied victory: ISIL kidnapping of Tomislav Salopek; Joint Iraqi-Croatian interventions against Da’esh; Operation Inherent Resolve formally concludes in 2026; Withdrawal of Croatian troops in Iraq by 2026

== Notes ==
Criteria for inclusion on these lists
1. The Republic of Croatia has never formally declared war since declaring independence in 1990. The Croatian Constitution (Articles 17 and 101) grants the Croatian Parliament the sole constitutional authority to formally declare war with the Croatian President serving as commander-in-chief. To display a wider sense of the scope of Croatian involvement in wars this list focuses on military conflicts involving Croatia military regardless of formal declaration.
2. There are several related articles that cover other forms of violence involving Croatia, such as terrorism in Europe or list of massacres during the Croatian War of Independence.
3. These lists do not focus on small-scale rebellions, single terror attacks, riots, assassinations, labor wars, state wars, feuds, range wars, or gang wars, as much as military conflicts involving the Croatian military.
4. These lists do not include conflicts where Croatia was exclusively providing military aid (weapons, ammunition, vehicles and other equipment), humanitarian aid, financial assistance or diplomatic support to other parties (e.g. Croatia and the Russo-Ukrainian war). It does include Croatian military non-combat activity that devolved into unofficial or unplanned combat activity or battlefield deaths.
5. These lists may include operations involving capturing of military or merchant vessels and/or military personnel either from Croatia to another nation or enemy non-state actor; or from another nation or non-state actor to Croatia (e.g. Croatian capture of small group of Taliban rebels during the War in Afghanistan).
6. This list does include combat and non-combat Croatian military activity within alliances such as NATO, the EU defence forces, or jointly with allies, e.g. alongside the United States in Operation Inherent Resolve. It does not include non-combat activity with nations with whom Croatia maintains military-to-military defence pacts.

Examples for criteria that are not included
Assassinations or assassination attempts: Assassination of Ivo Pukanić
Attacks on diplomatic missions: 2026 attack on Indian embassy in Zagreb
Humanitarian military operations: 2020 Zagreb earthquake military operation
Isolated terrorist attacks: 2020 St. Mark's Square shooting or 1995 Rijeka bombing
Anti-piracy or embargo enforcement military operations: Operation Atalanta or Operation Irini
NATO exercises and Croatian military exercises: Operation Sea Guardian or Operation Shield
NATO Enhanced Vigilance Activities: NATO Enhanced Forward Presence
Shows of force: Military aircraft fly-over after 2022 Zagreb Tu-141 drone crash
UN peacekeeping missions and Non-UN peacekeeping missions: Kosovo Force or UN Confidence Restoration Operation
