= Orders, decorations, and medals of Austria-Hungary =

This is a list of orders, decorations, and medals of Austria-Hungary.

== Orders ==
- Order of the Golden Fleece (Orden vom Goldenen Vlies)
- Military Order of Maria Theresa (Militär-Maria Theresien-Orden)
- Royal Hungarian Order of Saint Stephen (Königlich Ungarischer St. Stephans-Orden)
- Order of the Starry Cross (Hochadeliger Frauenzimmer-Sternkreuzorden)
- Austrian Imperial Order of Leopold (Österreichisch-kaiserlicher Leopolds-Orden)
- Austrian Imperial Order of the Iron Crown (Österreichisch-kaiserlicher Orden der Eisernen Krone)
- Austrian Imperial Order of Elizabeth (Kaiserlich österreichischer Elisabeth-Orden)
- | Imperial Austrian Order of Franz Joseph (Kaiserlich-österreichischer Franz Joseph-Orden)

== Decorations and medals ==
The following decorations and medals are listed in their order of wear from 1908.

- Military Merit Cross (Militärverdienstkreuz)
- Decoration of the Elizabeth-Theresian Military Foundation (Dekoration der Elisabeth Theresien-Militärstiftung)
- | Military Merit Medal (Signum Laudis) (Militär-Verdienstmedaille (Signum Laudis))
- | Merit Cross for Military Chaplains (Das Geistliche Verdienstkreuz)
- Bravery Medal (Tapferkeitsmedaille)
- | Cross of Merit (Verdienstkreuz)
- War Medal 1873 (Kriegsmedaille 1873)
- Commemorative Medal for the 1864 Campaign in Denmark (Erinnerungsmedaille an den Feldzug 1864 in Dänemark)
- Commemorative Medals for the Defenders of the Tyrol 1848 (Denkmünze für die Tiroler Landesverteidiger 1848)
- Commemorative Medal for the Defenders of the Tyrol 1859 (Denkmünze für die Tiroler Landesverteidiger 1859)
- Commemorative Medal for the Defenders of the Tyrol 1866 (Denkmünze für die Tiroler Landesverteidiger 1866)
- Military Long Service Crosses for Officers (Militärdienstzeichen für Offiziere)
- | Medal for 40 years Faithful Service (Ehrenmedaille für 40jährige treue Dienste)
- Military Long Service Crosses for Enlisted Men (Militärdienstzeichen für Unteroffiziere)
- | | 1898 Jubilee Medal (Jubiläums-Erinnerungsmedaille 1898)
- | | 1908 Jubilee Cross (Jubiläumskreuz)
- Sea Voyage Medal 1892-1893 (Seereise-Denkmünze 1892-1893)
- Fire Service Medal (Feuerwehrmedaille)

Medals not in the 1908 order of wear, in order of year of establishment

- Army Cross 1813/14 (Cannon Cross) (Armeekreuz 1813/14 (Kanonenkreuz)) - 1814
- Decoration of Honour for Art and Science (Ehrenzeichen für Kunst und Wissenschaft) - 1887
- Bosnia-Hercegovina Commemorative Medal (Bosnisch-Hercegovinische Erinnerungsmedaille) - 1909
- Mobilization Cross 1912/13 (Mobilisierungskreuz 1912/13) - 1913
- Decoration for Services to the Red Cross (Ehrenzeichen für Verdienste um das Rote Kreuz) - 1914
- War Cross for Civil Merits (Kriegskreuz für Zivildienste) - 1915
- Franz Joseph Cross (Franz-Joseph-Kreuz) - 1916
- Karl Troop Cross (Karl-Truppenkreuz) - 1916
- Wound Medal (Verwundetenmedaille) - 1917
- Civil Merit Medal (Zivilverdienstmedaille) - 1918
- Knight of the Golden Spur (Erinnerungszeichen für die Ritter vom Goldenen Sporn) - 1918
- Emperor and King Franz Joseph I. Commemorative Cross (Gedenkzeichen an Kaiser und König Franz Joseph I.) - 1918

== Order of wear from 1918 ==
Note: if the honour was awarded with 'war decoration' or 'swords' or with 'war decoration and swords' respectively, it would rank higher than the same honour without these additions. It would not, however, outrank any other grade of that honour or another type of honour.

1. Order of the Golden Fleece
2. Grand Cross of the Military Order of Maria Theresa
3. Commander of the Military Order of Maria Theresa
4. Knight of the Military Order of Maria Theresa
5. Grand Cross of the Royal Hungarian Order of Saint Stephen
6. 1st Class of the Military Merit Cross
7. Grand Cross of the Austrian Imperial Order of Leopold
8. 1st Class of the Austrian Imperial Order of Leopold
9. 1st Class of the Austrian Imperial Order of the Iron Crown
10. Grand Military Merit Medal
11. Gold Civil Merit Medal
12. | Grand Cross of the Imperial Austrian Order of Franz Joseph
13. Commander of the Royal Hungarian Order of Saint Stephen
14. 2nd Class of the Military Merit Cross
15. Commander of the Austrian Imperial Order of Leopold
16. 2nd Class of the Austrian Imperial Order of the Iron Crown
17. | Commander with Star of the Imperial Austrian Order of Franz Joseph
18. Knight of the Royal Hungarian Order of Saint Stephen
19. Knight of the Austrian Imperial Order of Leopold
20. | Commander of the Imperial Austrian Order of Franz Joseph
21. | Officer of the Imperial Austrian Order of Franz Joseph
22. 3rd Class of the Austrian Imperial Order of the Iron Crown
23. | Knight of the Imperial Austrian Order of Franz Joseph
24. Gold Bravery Medal for Officers
25. Silver Bravery Medal for Officers
26. 3rd Class of the Military Merit Cross
27. 1st Class of the Merit Cross for Military Chaplains – on the red-and-white-ribbon
28. 2nd Class of the Merit Cross for Military Chaplains – on the red-and-white-ribbon
29. 1st Class of the Merit Cross for Military Chaplains – on the white ribbon
30. 2nd Class of the Merit Cross for Military Chaplains – on the white ribbon
31. Silver Military Merit Medal – on the ribbon of the Military Cross of Merit
32. Bronze Military Merit Medal – on the ribbon of the Military Cross of Merit
33. Silver Military Merit Medal – on the red ribbon
34. Bronze Military Merit Medal – on the red ribbon
35. Civil Merit Medal
36. Decoration of the Elizabeth-Theresian Military Foundation
37. Gold Bravery Medal
38. Gold Cross of Merit with the Crown – on the ribbon of the Bravery Medal
39. Gold Cross of Merit with the Crown – on the red ribbon
40. Gold Cross of Merit – on the ribbon of the Bravery Medal
41. Gold Cross of Merit – on the red ribbon
42. Silver Bravery Medal 1st Class
43. Silver Bravery Medal 2nd Class
44. Silver Cross of Merit with the Crown – on the ribbon of the Bravery Medal
45. Silver Cross of Merit with the Crown – on the red ribbon
46. Silver Cross of Merit – on the ribbon of the Bravery Medal
47. Silver Cross of Merit – on the red ribbon
48. Bronze Bravery Medal
49. Iron Cross of Merit with the Crown – on the ribbon of the Bravery Medal
50. Iron Cross of Merit with the Crown – on the red ribbon
51. Iron Cross of Merit – on the ribbon of the Bravery Medal
52. Iron Cross of Merit – on the red ribbon
53. Karl Troop Cross
54. Wound Medal
55. War Medal 1873
56. Commemorative Medal for the 1864 Campaign in Denmark
57. Commemorative Medals for the Defenders of the Tyrol 1848
58. Commemorative Medal for the Defenders of the Tyrol 1859
59. Commemorative Medal for the Defenders of the Tyrol 1866
60. Military Long Service Crosses for Officers (1st Class)
61. | Medal for 40 years Faithful Service
62. Military Long Service Crosses for Officers (2nd Class)
63. Military Long Service Crosses for Officers (3rd Class)
64. Decoration for Services to the Red Cross (2nd Class) (and all higher decorations of the Red Cross as ribbon bars)
65. Military Long Service Crosses for Enlisted Men (1st Class)
66. Military Long Service Crosses for Enlisted Men (2nd Class)
67. Military Long Service Crosses for Enlisted Men (3rd Class)
68. Silver medal of Honour of the Red Cross
69. Bronze medal of Honour of the Red Cross
70. 1898 Jubilee Court Medal
71. 1898 Gold Jubilee Medal for the Armed Forces
72. 1898 Bronze Jubilee Medal for the Armed Forces
73. 1898 Jubilee Medal for Civil Servants
74. 1908 Jubilee Court Cross
75. 1908 Military Jubilee Cross
76. 1908 Jubilee Cross for Civil Servants
77. Decoration for many years as a meritorious member of a body obligated to Landsturm service
78. Bosnia-Hercegovina Commemorative Medal
79. Mobilization Cross 1912/13
80. Sea Voyage Medal 1892-1893
81. Fire Service Medal
82. Orders, Decorations, and Medals of the Sovereign Military Order of Malta
83. Marian Cross

== See also ==
- Orders, decorations, and medals of Austria
