= Kornél Oszlányi =

Hungarian military officer

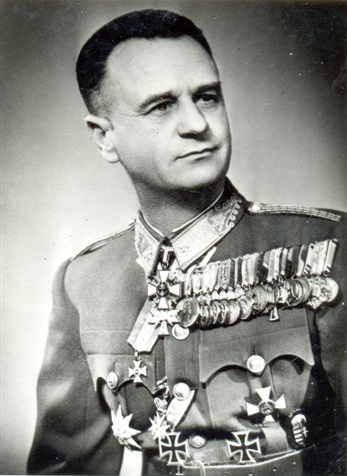
- Born: 25 September 1893; Kaposvár, Somogy County, Kingdom of Hungary Austria-Hungary
- Died: 16 November 1960 (aged 67); Cleveland, Ohio, United States
- Military career
- Allegiance: Austria-Hungary; Kingdom of Hungary
- Branch: Austro-Hungarian Army; Royal Hungarian Army
- Service years: 1911–1945
- Rank: Major general
- Conflicts: World War I World War II

Vitéz Kornél Oszlányi (25 September 1893 – 16 November 1960) was a Hungarian military officer who served as division commander during World War II.

== Military career ==
Kornél Oszlányi was born 25 September 1893, in Kaposvár, Hungary. He graduated from the Kassaer Infantry Cadet School in 1911. During World War I he was a company commander of the 52nd Infantry Regiment. In the battle of Nowica, Eastern Galicia in July 1917, he was decorated with the Gold Bravery Medal for extraordinary heroism.

In 1927 he became a member of the Ministry of Defence. Between 1933 and 1936 he was the Head of Order of Vitéz's National Defence Department. In March 1939 as commanding officer of the 15th Bicycle Battalion with the rank of lieutenant colonel, he took part in the recapture of Kárpátalja. Between 1941 and 1942 he was the commander of the 2nd "József nádor" Infantry Regiment with the rank of colonel.

From November 1942 he fought as the commanding officer of III Corps, 9th Infantry Division from Nagykanizsa at the river Don. During the retreat he led his division with extraordinary heroism, but in reported cases he had to be cruel with his men to maintain discipline.

At the river Don, his division held back the soviet troops for 12 days, and after that, he covered the retreat of the German forces. He suffered serious wounds in the battle, ending his command of 9th Infantry Division.

During World War II he was the only person who received in 1944, the Knight's Cross of the Military Order of Maria Theresa. During the invasion of the soviet forces into the Carpathian Basin in 1944, he led the 10th Infantry Division at Kaposvár.

After release from American captivity first he lived in Germany, and from 1951 in the United States of America. He was posthumously promoted to lieutenant general in 1993.

== Awards and decorations ==

1st row	Military Order of Maria Theresa Knight's Cross	Order of Merit of the Kingdom of Hungary Commander's Cross war ribbon with swords	Golden Medal for Bravery for Officers	Order of Merit of the Kingdom of Hungary Officer's Cross
2nd row	Silver Military Merit Medal on war ribbon with swords	Silver Military Merit Medal on war ribbon with swords	Bronze Military Merit Medal on war ribbon with swords	Bronze Military Merit Medal on war ribbon with swords
3rd row	Hungarian Silver Military Merit Medal on war ribbon with swords	Hungarian Bronze Military Merit Medal on war ribbon with swords	Fire Cross 1st class with wreath and swords	Karl Troop Cross
4th row	Wound Medal (Austria-Hungary)	National Defence Cross	Hungarian World War I Commemorative Medal	Long Service Crosses for Officers 2nd class
5th row	Upper Hungary Commemorative Medal	Transylvania Commemorative Medal	Lower Hungary Commemorative Medal	Decoration for Services to the Red Cross Merit Cross, 2nd class
6th row	Mobilization Cross 1912/13	Order of the Crown of King Zvonimir 1st class cross with star	Iron Cross 1st class	Iron Cross 2nd class
7th row	Bulgarian World War I Commemorative Medal	War Commemorative Medal (Austria)		
Badge	Badge of the Order of Vitéz			
