= Andreas von Fail-Griessler =

Austro-Hungarian General of Infantry

His Excellency Andreas von Fail-Griessler
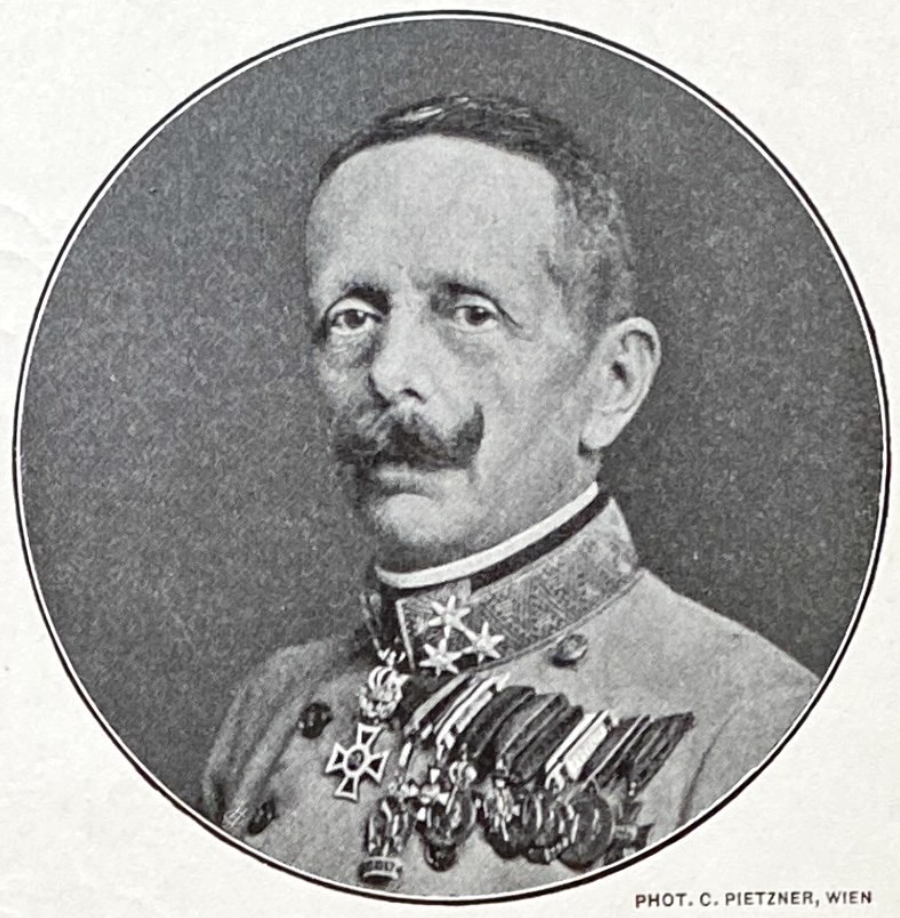
- Andreas von Fail-Griessler in 1916
- Born: Andreas Karl Franz Fail; 25 February 1857; Graz, Austrian Empire
- Died: 6 March 1919 (aged 57); Graz, Austria
- Spouse: Albina (Alba) Schönauer m.1894
- Military career
- Allegiance: Austria-Hungary
- Branch: Austro-Hungarian Army
- Service years: 1875–1915
- Rank: General der Infanterie (General of Infantry)
- Conflicts: World War I

Andreas Karl Franz Fail, from 1875 Fail-Griessler (Hungarian: Fail-Griessler András) was an Austro-Hungarian General of Infantry. He was born 25 February 1857 in Graz and died 6 March 1919 in Graz. At the beginning of the First World War he was commander of the 32nd Infantry Troop Division in Syrmia during the Serbian campaign, then from September to November 1914 commanding general of the VII Army Corps, which during this time was deployed with the k.u.k. 2nd and 3rd Armies at the Carpathians (Mezölaborcz-Łupków Pass area).

== Life ==
Fail, later Fail-Griessler, was the illegitimate son of real estate owner Joseph Andreas Tobias Griessler (b.1824) and Marianna Fail. One year after he was born, his father married Ida Pann, the daughter of KuK postmaster of Gonoblitz.

== Career ==
Andreas Griessler attended the Theresian Military Academy in Wiener Neustadt between 1871 and 1875. His father had also been an officer. On 1 September 1875 he was assigned as a lieutenant to the Imperial and Royal 57th Infantry Regiment "Prince Saxe-Coburg-Saalfeld". After attending war school from 1879, he embarked on a career as an Imperial and Royal General Staff officer. General Staff Officer. In 1881 he was transferred to the k.u.k. 4th Infantry Brigade as a first lieutenant in the general staff. Until 1887, Griessler was seconded to various units of the Joint Army.

In April 1887 he was assigned to the Operations Department at the Imperial and Royal General Staff. General Staff, to which he was to belong until 1892. In April 1892, meanwhile promoted to captain, he took over a command for the first time as company commander with the k.u.k. 35th Infantry Regiment "Freiherr von Sterneck" in Pilsen. In 1894 he changed again to the General Staff Service with the II Army Corps. From 1895 to 1898 he was an instructor at the war school in Vienna. In October 1898, as a lieutenant colonel, he was entrusted with the command of a battalion in the k.u.k. 13th Infantry Regiment "Jung-Starhemberg" in Krakow. After his promotion to colonel, he became chief of staff of the I Army Corps in July 1900. In April 1906 he took command of the Imperial and Royal 12th Mountain Brigade in Banja Luka and the following month was promoted to Major General. From April 1909 to April 1910 he was with the V Army Corps before being entrusted with command of the k.u.k. 32nd Infantry Troop Division in Budapest. This was followed by his promotion to field marshal lieutenant in May 1910.

At the outbreak of the First World War, his division was under the IV Army Corps of the 2nd Army assigned to the Balkan Forces under the command of General of Cavalry Eduard von Böhm-Ermolli and took part in the Serbian campaign. In early August 1914, his division was on the Sava-Danube border with the IV Corps and fought in the Šabac area until the end of August, before the 2nd Army was transferred to the hard-pressed Eastern Front.

In the Battle of Galicia, Fail-Griessler commanded the k.u.k. 32nd Infantry Troop Division on 8 September in the fighting around Rumno southwest of Lemberg. After the devastating Austro-Hungarian defeat at the Battle of Rawa Ruska and the retreat to the San, he was promoted to General der Infanterie in October, replacing Otto Meixner von Zweienstamm as commander of the VII Army Corps. With the corps, he took part in the fighting in the Carpathians as part of the 2nd and 3rd Armies in the autumn of 1914. After some successes in October and the participation of his corps in the recapture of the Uzsok Pass, the Russians subsequently pushed the Austro-Hungarian troops back. Even before the loss of the Dukla Pass at the end of November 1914, Andreas von Fail-Griessler was officially relieved of his duties on 18 November due to illness. He retired from active service on 1 January 1915. He was finally appointed Privy Councillor in 1917. Andreas von Fail-Griessler, who had been widowed since 1916, died in his home town of Graz in 1919.

== Honours and awards ==
=== Domestic ===
- Bronze Military Merit Medal (BMVM), 15/04/1892
- Military Merit Cross, 3rd Class (MVK3), 23/09/1898
- 1898 Bronze Military Jubilee Medal for the Armed Forces (MJM98), 02/12/1898
- Military Service Medal for Officers, 3rd Class (D3), 02/02/1903
- Imperial Order of the Iron Crown, 3rd Class (EKO-R3), 15/09/1904
- Bosnia-Hercegovina Commemorative Medal (BM), 05/10/1908
- 1908 Military Jubilee Cross (MJK08), 02/12/1908
- Military Service Medal for Officers, 2nd Class (D2), 01/02/1913
- Mobilisation Cross 1912–13 (MK13), 19/07/1913
- Imperial Order of Leopold:
  - Knight's Cross (LO-R), 08/03/1912
  - Commander's Cross with War Decoration (LO-K, KD), 25/10/1914
- Privy Counsellor, 11/08/1917

=== Foreign ===
- Albert Order, Knight's Cross 1st Class, 05/07/1888
