= Wilhelm von Reinländer =

Austro-Hungarian military officer (1829–1910)

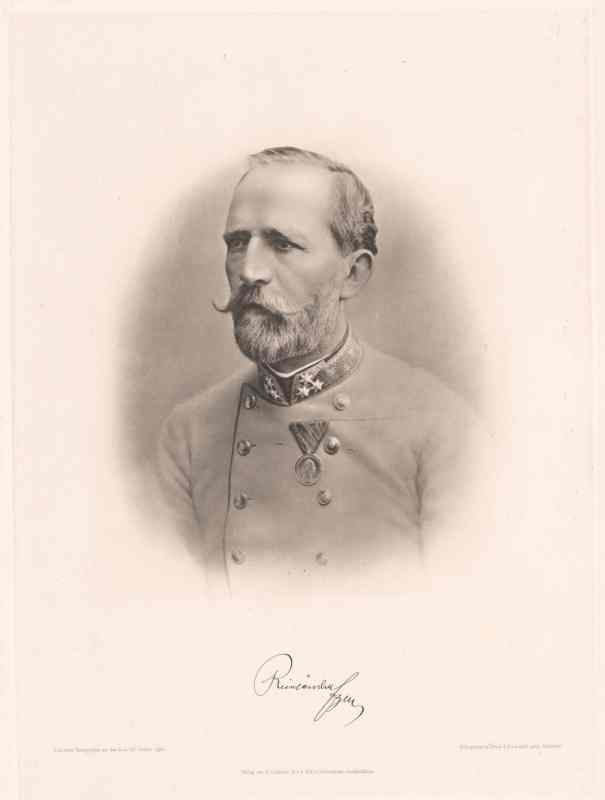
- Born: 28 June 1829; Pouzdřany, Bohemia, Austrian Empire
- Died: 28 January 1910 (aged 80); Portorož, Istria, Austria-Hungary
- Military career
- Allegiance: Austrian Empire; Austria-Hungary
- Branch: Imperial Austrian Army; Austro-Hungarian Army
- Service years: 1845–1905
- Rank: Feldzeugmeister
- Unit: 24th Infantry Regiment
- Commands: Inspector General of the Army
- Conflicts: Revolutions of 1848; Hungarian Revolution of 1848; Second Italian War of Independence; Austro-Prussian War
- Awards: See decorations section

Wilhelm Freiherr von Reinländer (28 June 1829 – 28 January 1910) was a Czech-Austrian nobleman and Austro-Hungarian military officer. He served as Inspector General of the Army.

== Biography ==
In 1845, he began his service in the Imperial Austrian Army, joining the 40th Infantry Regiment. Three years later, he was promoted to the rank of Leutnant (lieutenant). He took part in suppressing the Hungarian Revolution of 1848, following which he was assigned as an officer to the General Staff—a position he held during the Second Italian War of Independence. From 1861, he taught tactics at the War School in Vienna. He also participated in combat during the Austro-Prussian War. After the conflict ended, he became a military instructor to the heir to the throne, Archduke Rudolf, a role he held until 1876. In 1877, he was appointed commander of the 28th Infantry Brigade, which he led during the occupation of Bosnia and Herzegovina in 1878. In 1886, holding the rank of Feldmarschall-Leutant (lieutenant field marshal), he assumed command of the 10th Corps. That same year, he was ennobled by Emperor Franz Joseph I. In 1889, he was promoted to the rank of Feldzeugmeister (general of the artillery). Following the death of Field Marshal Archduke Albrecht, the Austro-Hungarian Army underwent a reform that established the positions of General-Truppen-Inspektoren (inspectors of the armed forces); Reinländer was appointed to one of these posts. In 1905, under pressure from Archduke Franz Ferdinand, he resigned from his position and retired. From 1885 he was colonel-in-chief of the 24th Infantry Regiment.

== Decorations ==
Reinländer's decorations include, among others:

- (Habsburg monarchy) Austrian Empire / Austria-Hungary:
  - Grand Cross of the Order of Leopold
  - Order of the Iron Crown
    - Knight, 1st Class
    - Knight, 2nd Class with War Decoration
  - Military Merit Cross with Diamonds and War Decoration
  - Military Merit Medal on Red Ribbon
  - War Medal 1873
  - 1898 Jubilee Medal
  - Military Service Badge, 1st Class
- Prussia: Grand Cross of the Order of the Red Eagle
- Ottoman Empire: Order of the Medjidie, 4th Class

== Bibliography ==
- Österreichisches Biographisches Lexikon 1815–1950 (ÖBL). Band 9 (in German), Vienna: Österreichischen Akademie der Wissenschaften, 1984
- Hof- und Staatshandbuch der Österreichisch-Ungarischen Monarchie für das Jahr 1905 (in German), Vienna: K. K. Hof- und Staatsdruckerei, 1905
