= Konrad Grallert von Cebrów =

Divisional commander in the Austro-Hungarian Army

Konrad Grallert von Cebrów (27 March 1865 – 1942) was a divisional commander in the Austro-Hungarian Army.

== Life ==
Feldmarschall-Leutnant Konrad Grallert von Cebrów was born as Konrad Karl August Grallert in Gumbinnen (East Prussia) to Joachim Grallert (a prominent watchmaker and jeweller) and Berthe Hoefler.

His family moved to Arad in the Transylvanian region of Hungary (now part of Romania) in 1867. He was a qualified general staff officer and certainly by his appointment at the cadet school at Kraków in 1901 was already a member of the general staff.

He was involved with the German attacks that were repulsed by the Russians on the Dvina and at Cebrow in Galicia on 9 March 1916. He was raised to nobility by Charles IV and received the right to use the name "of Cebrow” in 1917 or 1918.

Konrad's older brother inherited the family business and after the war Konrad moved to Papa, which is in Western Hungary today. He was the head teacher of a secondary school. He died in Budapest, 1942.

== Promotions ==
- Hauptmann 1. Classe: 1 May 1896
- Major: 01 Nov 1903
- Oberstleutnant: 01 Nov 1907
- Oberst: 04 Jan 1911
- Generalmajor: 05 Dec 1914
- Feldmarschall-Leutnant: 08 Dec 1917

== Appointments ==
- Senior Instructor Infantry Cadet School Lobzów near Craców: 1901
- Chief of Staff II Hungarian Landwehr District: 1903
- Chief of Staff 15th Infantry Division: 1909
- Commanding officer Infantry Regiment Number 101: Oct 1910 - Sep 1914
- Commander 64th Infantry Brigade: Sep 1914 - July 1916
- Commander 61st Infantry Division: July - Dec 1916
- Commander 74th Honvéd Infantry Division: Apr 1917 - Oct 1917
- Inspector of Replacements Craców 1918 - war's end

== Decorations ==
- Military Merit Cross 2nd Class with War Decoration
- Order of the Iron Crown 2nd Class with War Decoration and Swords
- Knight's Cross of the Order of Leopold with War Decoration and Swords
- Order of the Iron Crown 3rd Class with War Decoration and Swords
- Bronze Military Merit Medal (Signum Laudis) with Swords
- Military Jubilee Medal 1898
- Military Jubilee Cross 1908
- Mobilization Cross 1912-13
