= Military Jubilee Cross =

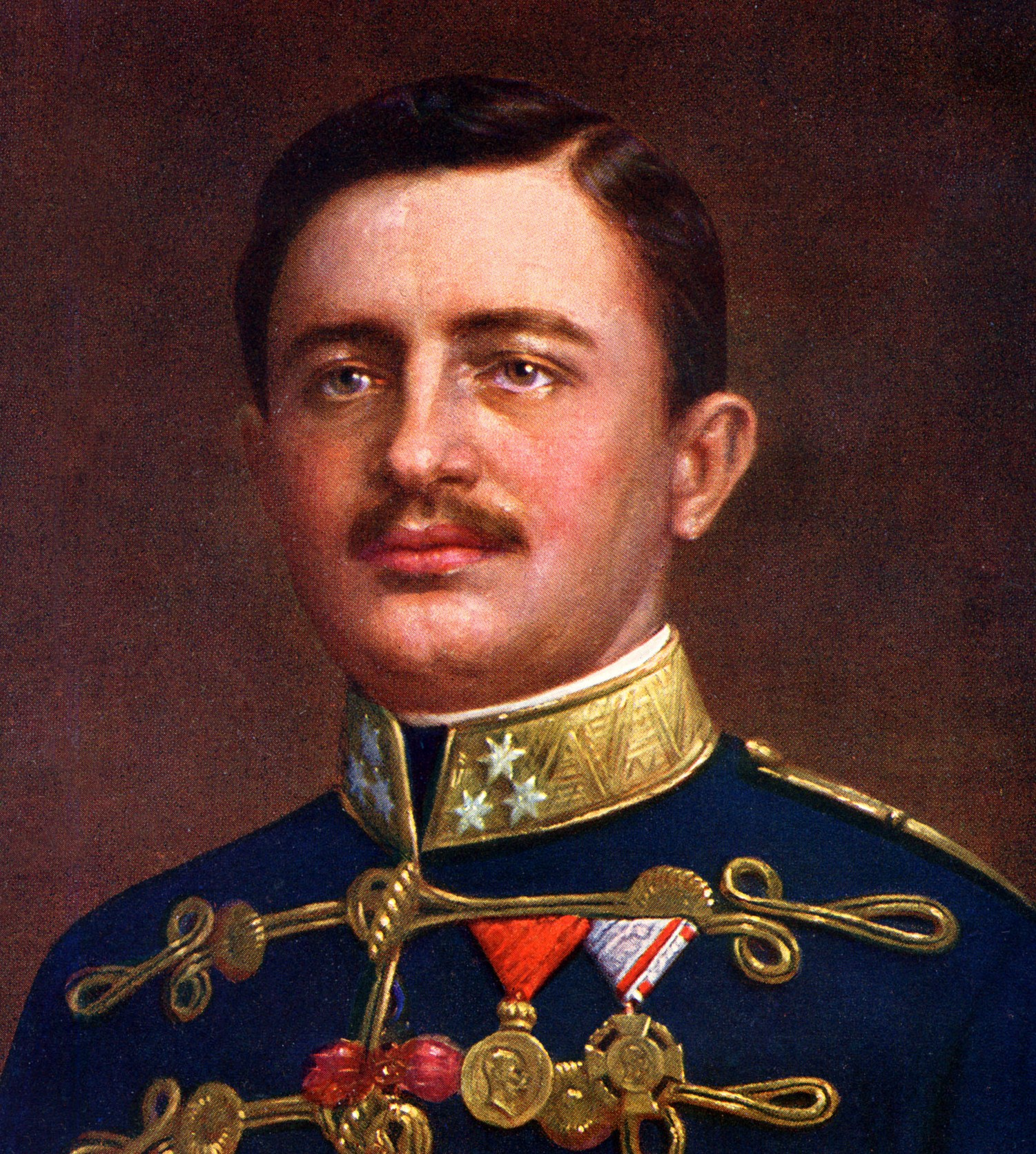
Archduke Charles wearing the Order of the Golden Fleece (left), the Military Merit Medal (middle) and the Jubilee Cross (right), 1915.

The Military Jubilee Cross was an award of Austria-Hungary. Unlike the 1898 Jubilee Medal it was not awarded at different levels to the same recipient. Therefore it was set up with three possible variants at different levels, the highest being the Military Jubilee Cross. A recipient could only wear the highest level to which they were entitled was awarded or worn.

It was founded on 14 August 1908 by Franz Joseph I to mark the sixtieth anniversary of his accession and was a variant of the 1908 Jubilee Cross intended for the armed forces of Austria-Hungary. Almost all professional soldiers, sailors and gendarmes in active service at the time the Cross was instituted were eligible, along with all conscripted personnel as long as they were in at least their second year of military service at that date or (regardless of rank or position) had fought in the Italian campaign and in a battle alongside the emperor in 1848 under the leadership of Field Marshal Josef Wenzel Radetzky von Radetz.

On 31 December 1914 (though the decision was only published the following month) it was decided that all officers on active service would be awarded the Military Jubilee Cross, even if they were not entitled to it in 1908, for example as reservists. In this case, the Military Jubilee Cross was worn instead of any other level of the Jubilee Cross they might have been awarded earlier.

== Insignia and ribbon ==
The order's insignia matched the other versions of the 1908 Jubilee Cross. Created by the chamber medallist Rudolf Marschall, it is a cross pattée 3.7 cm in diameter with its armed connected by a laurel wreath. At the centre is a round medallion 2 cm in diameter showing its founder's portrait bust, in a field marshal's uniform, wearing the Order of the Golden Fleece and facing to the heraldic left. It is inscribed 'FRANC IOS I' at the left, whilst the reverse of the medallion is smooth with the dates "1848 1908".

The decoration was worn on the left breast on a 40 mm wide white triangular band, with a 5 mm wide red side stripe 3 mm from the edge.

== Bibliography ==
- (in German) Johann Stolzer, Christian Steeb: Österreichs Orden vom Mittelalter bis zur Gegenwart. Akademische Druck- und Verlagsanstalt, Graz 1996, ISBN 3-201-01649-7, p. 260–261.
- (in German) Roman von Procházka: Österreichisches Ordenshandbuch. Graf Klenau oHG, München 1974.
