= Order of Elizabeth (disambiguation) =

The Order of Elizabeth was a female order of merit in Austria-Hungary.

Order of Elizabeth or Elisabeth may also refer to:

- Order of Elizabeth and Theresa, a military decoration of Austria
- Order of Saint Elisabeth, a Roman Catholic religious order
- Order of Saint Elizabeth, a female order of knighthood of the House of Wittelsbach
- Order of Saint Elizabeth of Portugal, a female order of knighthood of the House of Braganza, see Order of Saint Isabel
- Royal Family Order of Elizabeth II, honour of the British royal family

== See also ==
- Sisters of Saint Elizabeth, a Roman Catholic religious institute
- Elizabeth Cross, British military award
- Elizabeth of Hungary
