= Rudolf Marschall =

Austrian sculptor and medalist (1873–1967)

Rudolf Marschall (December 3, 1873 – 1967) Austrian sculptor and medalist, born in Vienna. He studied in Vienna and Paris and became the Director of the Austrian State School of Engineering in 1905. He is best remembered for his portraits, medallions and bas-reliefs, such as on the Military Jubilee Cross.
