= Merit Cross for Military Chaplains =

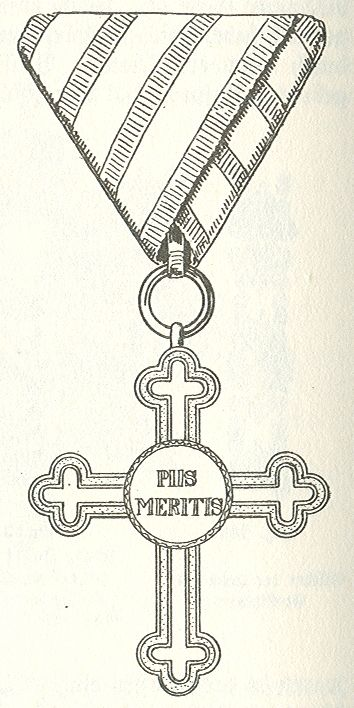
- Country: Austria-Hungary
- Status: No longer awarded
- Established: 23 November 1801
- | Ribbon bars

Precedence
- Next (higher): Military Merit Cross 3rd class
- Next (lower): Military Merit Medal in Siver

The Merit Cross for Military Chaplains (German: Geistliches Verdienstkreuz) was a military and civil award established on November 23, 1801, by Emperor Franz II in his function as Austrian monarch and was intended to honor military chaplains who excelled in fulfilling their duties in military pastoral care in a particularly strict and dangerous manner in service of the Habsburg Empire.

== History ==
The decoration of the order was awarded in gold (1st class) and in silver (2nd class). From December 13, 1916, the award for brave and successful behavior in front of the enemy could also be awarded with swords on the ribbon.

The religious sign is a Brabant cross with a medallion enameled blue on both sides, in the middle of which the two-line inscription PIIS MERITIS (For pious merits) can be read. From 1859 the Golden Cross of Merit received a white enameled medallion. The cross is suspended from a trifold ribbon.

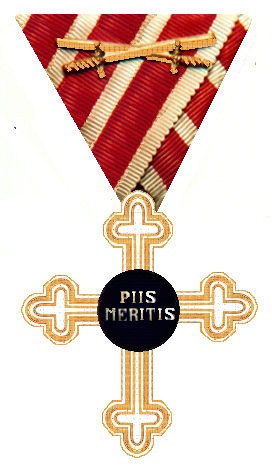
