= War Cross for Civil Merits =

War Cross for Civil Merits Kriegskreuz für Zivilverdienste
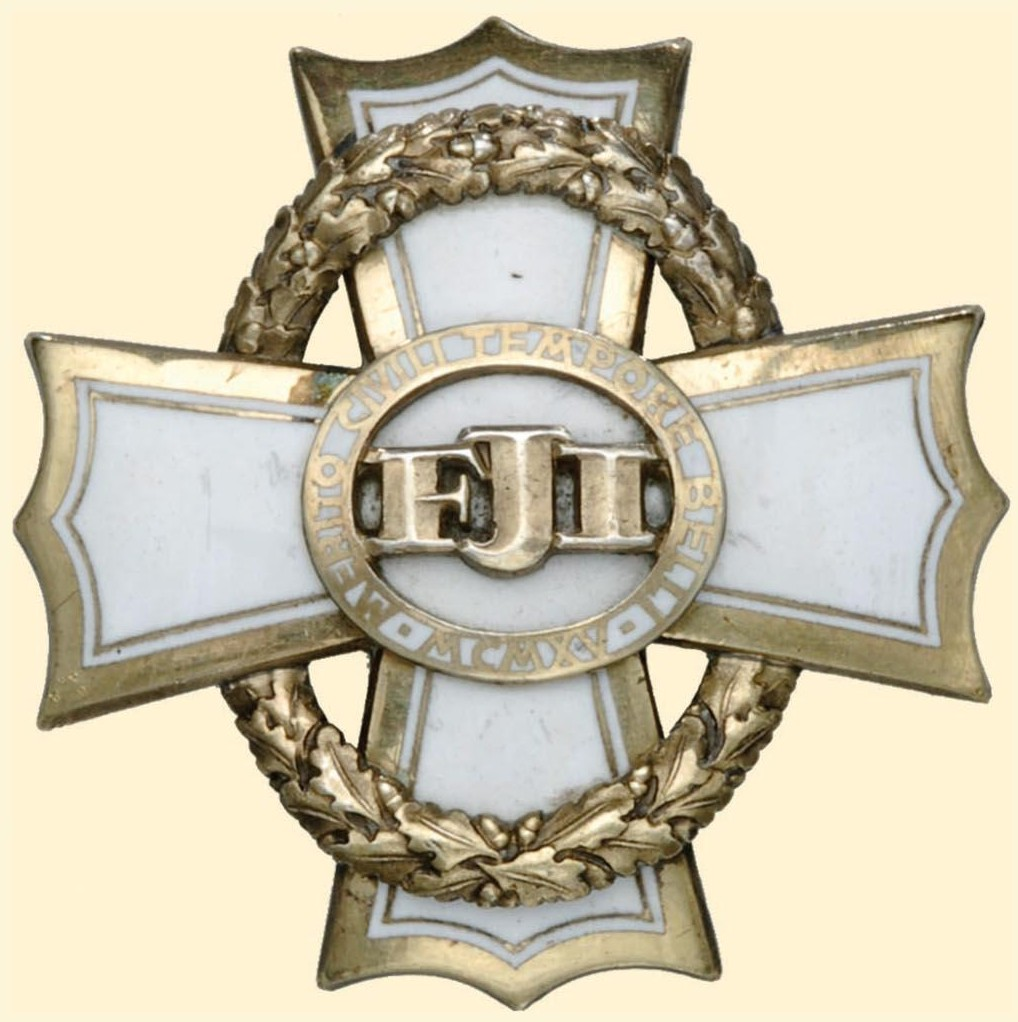
- War Cross for Civil Merits, first class
- Type: Four class, Civil decoration
- Awarded for: Distinguished service through outstanding zeal and sacrifice to the war effort
- Presented by: Austria-Hungary
- Status: No longer awarded after the fall of the Austrian Empire
- Established: 16 August 1915
- Final award: 1918

Precedence
- Next (higher): Military Merit Cross
- Next (lower): Military Merit Medal

The War Cross for Civil Merits (German: Kriegskreuz für Zivilverdienste) was a civil award of Austria-Hungary. Established on 16 August 1915 by Emperor Franz Joseph I of Austria, it recognized civilian war service during World War I. The cross could also be awarded to military officers for their contributions to the war but were not directly involved in combat operations.

== Appearance ==
The War Cross for Civil Merits is in the shape of a Cross pattée, The decoration measures 55 mm in height and 55 mm in width.A laurel wreath surrounds the central medallion, passing beneath the horizontal arms of the cross and in front of the vertical arms. The first- and second-class crosses are gilded, the third class is silver, and the fourth class is bronze.

The arms of the cross in the first through third classes are finished with white enamel. The central medallion, also enameled in white, displays the Emperor’s monogram “FJI” (Franz Joseph Imperator), encircled by the inscription “Merito Civili tempore belli MCMXV” (“Civil merit in time of war 1915”). The decoration was worn as a breast cross, attached directly to the coat or uniform.
