= Karl Troop Cross =

Karl Troop Cross Karl-Truppenkreuz
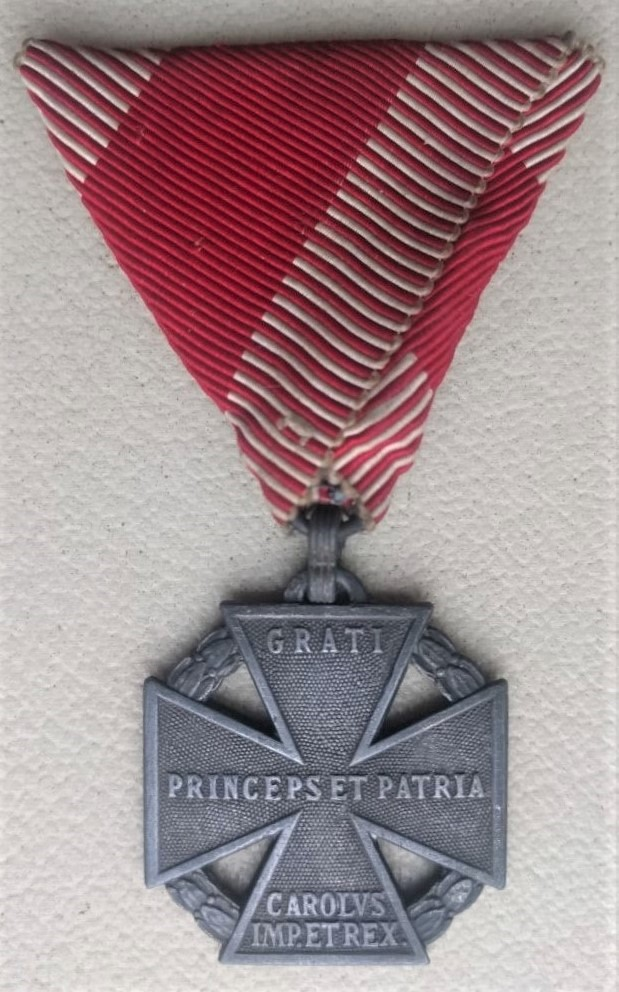
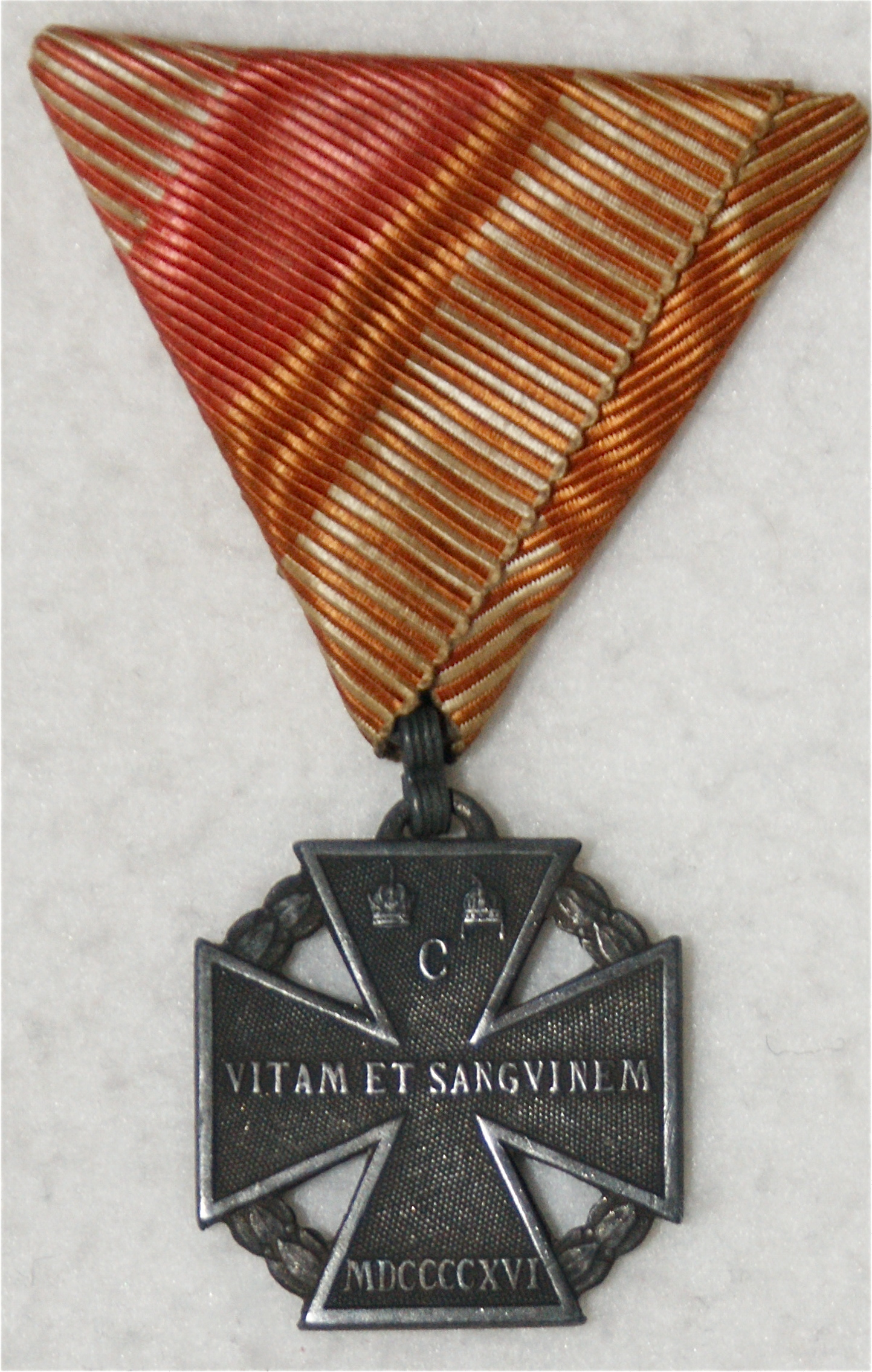
- Karl Troop Cross, obverse and reverse
- Type: Campaign medal
- Awarded for: At least 12 weeks of service with a combat unit, with service at the front
- Country: Austria-Hungary
- Eligibility: Members of the armed forces of the Austro-Hungarian Army
- Campaign: World War I
- Established: 13 December 1916
- Karl Troop Cross ribbon bar

Precedence
- Next (higher): Cross of Merit (Austria-Hungary)
- Next (lower): Wound Medal (Austria-Hungary)

The Karl Troop Cross (German: Karl-Truppenkreuz) was instituted on 13 December 1916 by Emperor Karl I of Austria-Hungary. The cross was awarded for service up to the end of the First World War to soldiers and sailors of all arms of the Austro-Hungarian armed forces, regardless of rank, who had been with a combatant unit for at least twelve weeks and who had participated in at least one battle. Members of the air service who made ten flights over enemy lines were also eligible. A total of 651,000 were awarded.

The medal is of zinc and consists of a cross pattée resting on a laurel wreath. The obverse bears the Latin inscription "GRATI PRINCEPS ET PATRIA, CAROLVS IMP.ET REX", (A grateful prince and country, Charles, Emperor and King). The reverse shows the Austrian Imperial and Hungarian Royal crowns above the letter "C" (for Carolus) with the inscription "VITAM ET SANGVINEM", (With life and blood) and the date MDCCCCXVI, (1916). The design is based on the design of the Army Cross of 1813–1814 (usually known as the ‘Cannon Cross’ – ‘Kanonenkreuz’).

The cross was worn on the left chest from a red ribbon with alternate red-white side strips towards each edge.

== See also ==
Hindenburg Cross
