= Order of Elizabeth and Theresa =

Austro-Hungarian Empire decoration

Imperial and Royal Decoration of Elisabeth and Theresa Elisabeth-Theresien-Orden Elisabetho-Theresian Military Foundation Elisabeth-Theresianische Militärstiftung
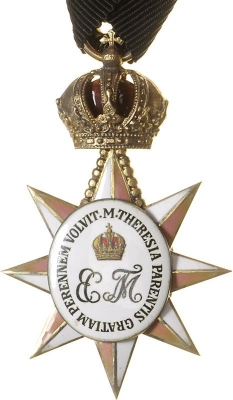
- Medal of the Order

Awarded by Holy Roman Empire, Austrian Empire, Austria-Hungary
- Type: State Knighthood Order
- Motto: MARIA THERESIA PARENTIS GRATIAM perennem VOLUIT
- Eligibility: see conditions
- Status: No longer awarded
- Sovereign: Archduke Karl of Austria
- Grades: Knight

Precedence
- Next (higher): Military Merit Medal
- Next (lower): Gold Bravery Medal for Enlisted Men
- Ribbon of the order

The Imperial and Royal Decoration of Elizabeth and Theresa (in German: Elisabeth-Theresien-Orden) was a decoration of the Austro-Hungarian Empire, created in 1750 by Empress Consort Elizabeth Christine in her testament. It was later revised in 1771 by her daughter Maria Theresa, Holy Roman Empress, as the Elizabetho-Theresian Military Foundation (Elisabeth-Theresianische Militärstiftung).

The order must not be mistaken with the all-female Order of Elizabeth, established by Franz Joseph I of Austria in 1898 to commemorate the memory of his late assassinated wife "Sissi".

== History ==
It was created in Vienna in 1750 by Elisabeth Christine of Brunswick-Wolfenbüttel, widow of Charles VI, Holy Roman Emperor, in her testament, to reward the deserving officers who distinguished in battles. Originally the number of awarded officers was hardly 20. Those had to serve faithfully in the army of the House of Austria for 30 years and having reached at least the rank of colonel and had to be inscribed in the Court Council of War, but without distinction of fatherland, birth, or religion. The Order was granted with 16,000 florins of annuity to be divided among the recipients. There was originally three grades of annuity: 1000, 800, and 500 florins.

In 1771, Maria Theresa settled a maximum number of 21 members, after having rejected several petitions to modify the access to the Order. The yearly pension amount was also revised: six times 853 florins and 76 kreutzers, eight times 683 florins and seven times 426 florins and 85 kreutzers (100 kreutzers = 1 florin). The religion of the recipients did not matter. The catholic officers were expected to pray three times Pater Noster and Ave Maria for the founder and the reigning sovereign. The Protestants were free from this but they were expected to offer each year three ducats to the Invalides Institute.

In the 18th century, there was no retirement pension yet, there were lifelong institution like this one. In France, a similar institution was an Institute founded as the Order of Military Merit (France) by Louis XV in 1759.

The Order was cancelled by the Austrian Republic in 1918.

== Rank and insignia ==
The Order only has one rank: Knight.

The decoration consists of a star of gold with eight triangles (enamelled in half-red, half-silver) and supported by the imperial crown, charged with an oval shield in the heart with the initials of the two empresses (ECMT for Elizabeth Christine Maria Theresa), all topped by a crown, surrounded by the legend: MARIA THERESIA PARENTIS GRATIAM perennem VOLUIT.

The ribbon of the Order is black. The decoration was hanging from a triangular knot of that black ribbon on the left chest.

== Feast day ==
The religious feast with knights was determined on the 19 November, the day of Saint Elizabeth of Hungary. It was never celebrated, but in the Augustinian Court Church in Vienna, a solemn High Mass was held.
