= Army Cross 1813/14 =

Army Cross 1813/14 Armeekreuz für 1813/14
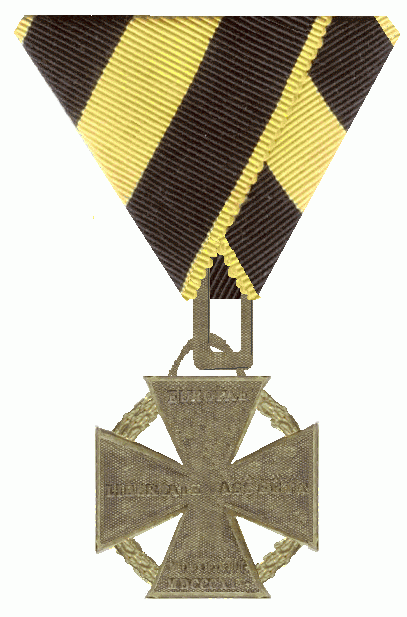
- Army Cross 1813-14 with incorrect ribbon
- Country: Austria-Hungary
- Status: No longer awarded
- Ribbon of the decoration

The Army Cross for the Wars' of 1813–14, (German: Der Armeekreuz für 1813/14), also called the "Cannon Cross", was a military decoration of the Austrian Empire during the Napoleonic Wars. It was created on 13 May 1814 by decree of Emperor Francis II of Austria. The decoration could be awarded to all soldiers who took part in German Wars of Liberation against Emperor Napoleon I.

== Appearance ==
The decoration is a paw cross made of bronze captured French guns with a laurel wreath running between the arms of the cross. On the arms of the cross from top to bottom the inscription GRATI PRINCEPS ET PATRIA FRANC · IMP · AUG · (In gratitude ruler and fatherland Emperor Franz). Back EUROPAE LIBERTATE ASSERTA MDCCCXIII/MDCCCXIV · (Those who ensured Europe's freedom 1813/1814).

The Army Cross was the first military mass award in the Habsburg Monarchy. During the First World War, the appearance of this decoration served as a model for the design of the Karl Troop Cross, newly created in December 1916.

== Wearing ==
The award was worn on a yellow ribbon with a black wide border stripe on the left side of the chest.

== Awards ==
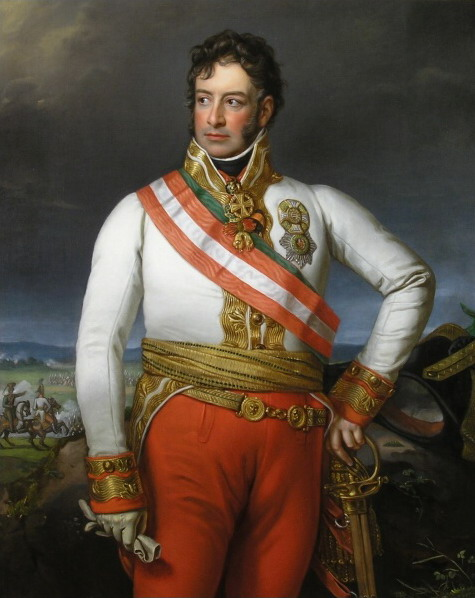
Karl Philipp, Prince of Schwarzenberg wearing the Grand Cross of the Award.

On 18 October 1814, Field Marshal Karl Philipp, Prince of Schwarzenberg as commander-in-chief of the allied troops, was awarded the Grand Army Cross made of gold for the wars' of 1813–14 by the Emperor. This honour is distinctively worn around the neck and can be seen in most portraits of Karl Philip, Prince of Schwarzenberg.

In total, the award was presented about 100,000 times.

== See also ==
- List of Austrian orders and decorations

== Literature ==
- Johann Stolzer, Christian Steeb: Österreichs Orden vom Mittelalter bis zur Gegenwart. Akademische Druck- und Verlagsanstalt Graz, ISBN 3-201-01649-7
