= Sea Voyage Medal 1892–1893 =

Austria-Hungary military award

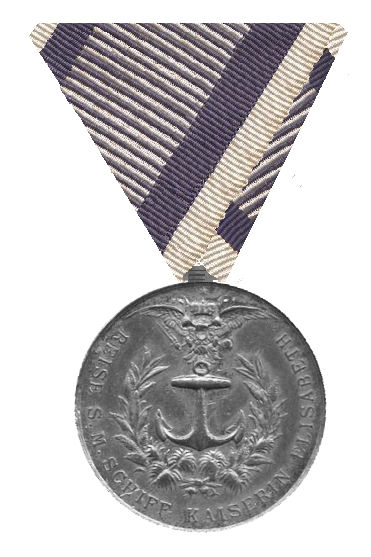
- Country: Austria-Hungary
- Status: No longer awarded
- Established: 22 December 1893
- Ribbon of the medal

Precedence
- Next (higher): Mobilization Cross 1912/13
- Next (lower): Fire Service Medal

The Sea Voyage Medal 1892–1893 (German: Seereise-Denkmünze 1892/93) was a military and civil decoration of Austria-Hungary established in 1898 and awarded for the anniversary of Emperor Franz Josef accession to the throne of the Habsburg Empire.

== History ==
The 1892/93 voyage commemorative medal was established by Emperor Franz Joseph I of Austria-Hungary on November 11, 1893 and was awarded to all participants of the ten-month long voyage to the Far East on the SMS Empress Elisabeth, including the heir to the throne, Archduke Franz Ferdinand.

The medal, made of gilded gunmetal, shows an anchor surrounded by a wreath of tropical plants. The double-headed eagle can be seen above the anchor with its wings spread wide. Circumferential JOURNEY S. M. SHIP EMPRESS ELISABETH. On the reverse there are intertwined initials F F (Franz Ferdinand) and the six-line inscription OST INDIA AUSTRALIEN SOUTH SEA ISLAND CHINA JAPAN 1892–1893. Underneath are a bound wreath of leaves.

The award was worn on the left breast on a white trifold ribbon with blue edging striped with blue water between.
