= Cross of Merit (Austria-Hungary) =

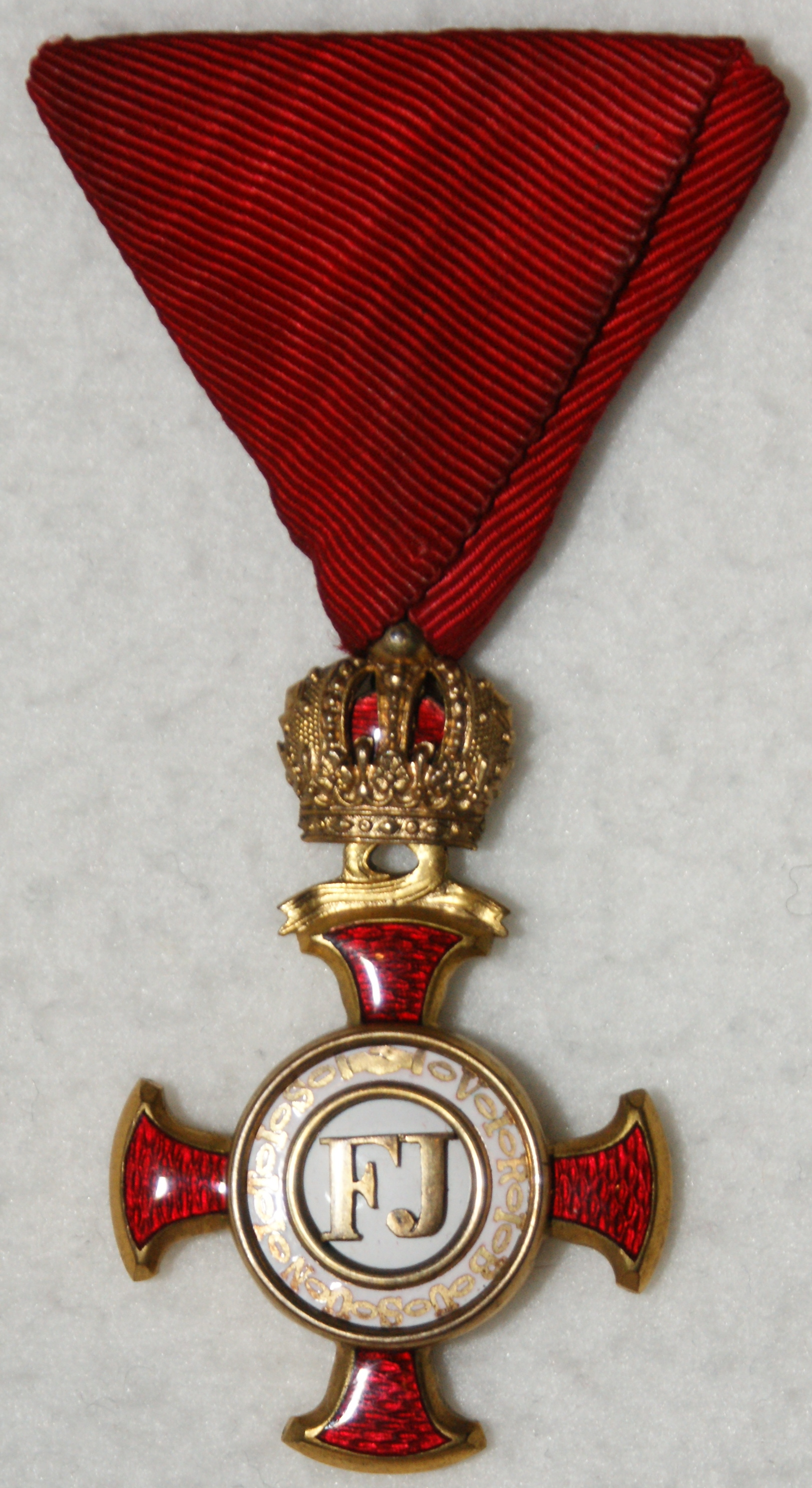
- Golden Cross of Merit with the Crown on the red (civilian) ribbon
- Description: Golden Cross of Merit with the Crown; Golden Cross of Merit; Silver Cross of Merit with the Crown; Silver Cross of Merit; Iron Cross of Merit with the Crown; Iron Cross of Merit
- Country: Austria-Hungary
- Status: No longer awarded
- Established: February 16, 1850
- | Ribbons with which the medals could be awarded

Precedence
- Next (higher): Gold Bravery Medal for Enlisted Men
- Next (lower): Karl Troop Cross

The Cross of Merit (German: Verdienstkreuz) (Hungarian: Érdemkereszt) was a military and civil decoration of Austria-Hungary established 16 February 1850. Emperor Franz Josef awarded the cross "to reward loyal and actively proven devotion to Emperor and Fatherland, many years of acknowledged beneficial use in public service or other merits earned for the general good".

== History ==
The establishment took place on February 16, 1850. The decoration came in four classes. During the First World War, the award was extended to include the Iron Cross of Merit with and without a crown on April 1, 1916, for the duration of the war. The latter class was intended exclusively for lower ranking soldiers. As a sign of bravery in the face of the enemy, Emperor Karl I introduced the awarding of swords to all classes of the Cross of Merit on December 13, 1916. When awarded with swords, they were to be placed on either a trifold ribbon or on a ribbon bar. The cross is suspended from a red trifold ribbon in peacetime and the ribbon of the Medal for Bravery in wartime.

== Ribbon ==
The decoration was worn on the deep crimson ribbon of the Order of Franz Joseph on the left side of the chest, to which its Knight’s Cross it bears a strong resemblance—apart from the double-headed eagle behind the cross.

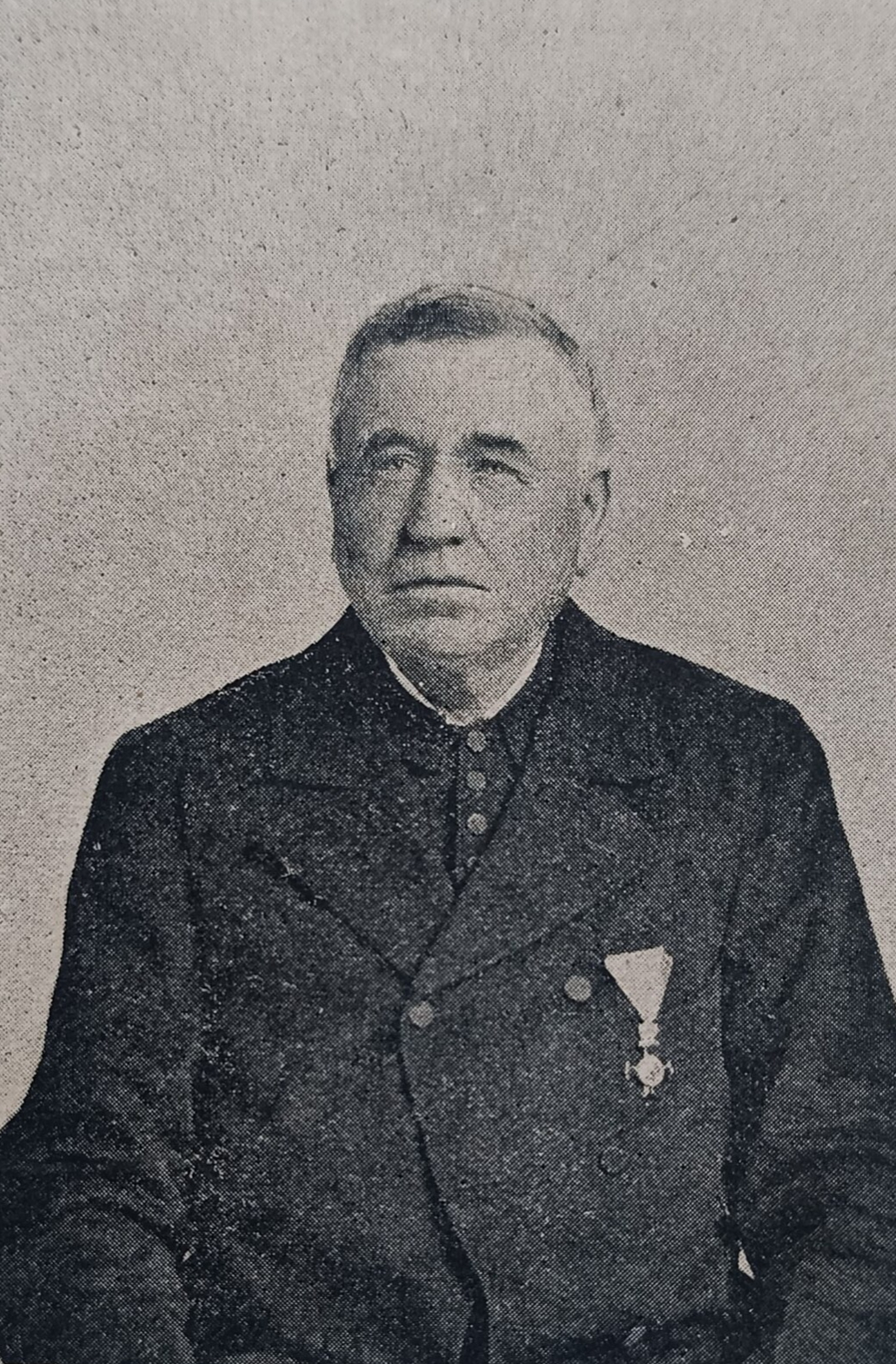
The Karlsdorf judge Mathias Schneider around 1902, wearing the Golden Cross of Merit with the Crown on the left side of his chest

Persons who were awarded the Civil Cross of Merit during the war were required, in accordance with the decree of 20 September 1914, to wear the decoration on the ponceau red-and-white striped ribbon of the Bravery Medal. The ribbon of the Bravery Medal was also used for the Military Merit Medal (“Signum Laudis”) and the Military Merit Cross, as well as for the various classes of the Order of Franz Joseph, provided it was awarded for services rendered in war.

== Classes ==
- Golden Cross of Merit with the Crown
- Golden Cross of Merit
- Silver Cross of Merit with the Crown
- Silver Cross of Merit
- Iron Cross of Merit with the Crown
- Iron Cross of Merit
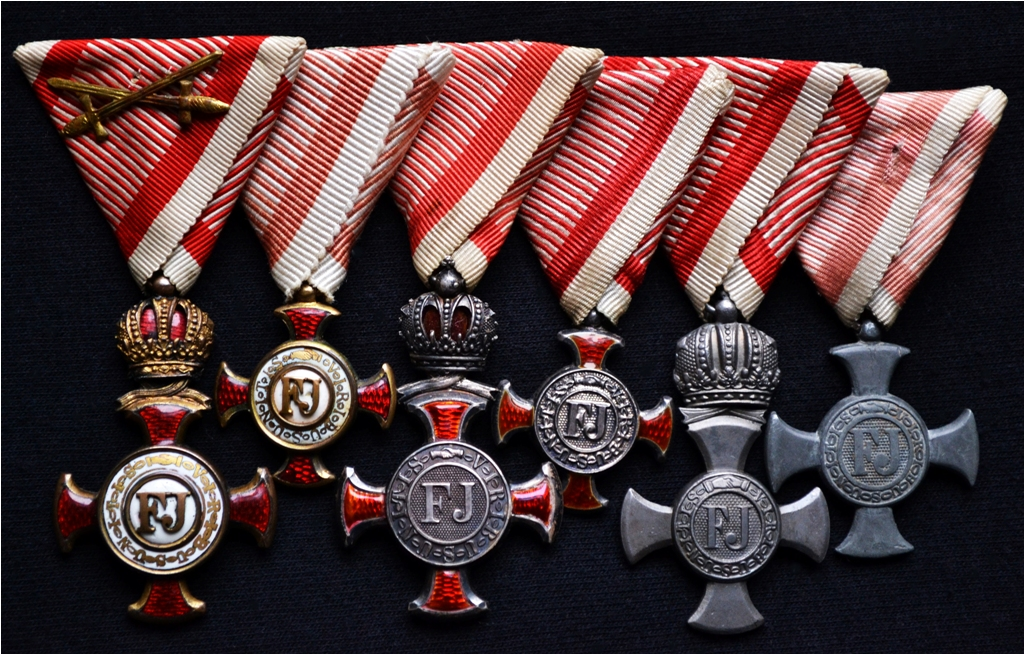
  All the classes of the Cross of Merit on the ribbon of the Medal for Bravery

== Literature ==
- Johann Stolzer, Christian Steeb: Österreichs Orden vom Mittelalter bis zur Gegenwart. Akademische Druck- und Verlagsanstalt, Graz 1996, ISBN 320-10164-9
