= War Medal 1873 =

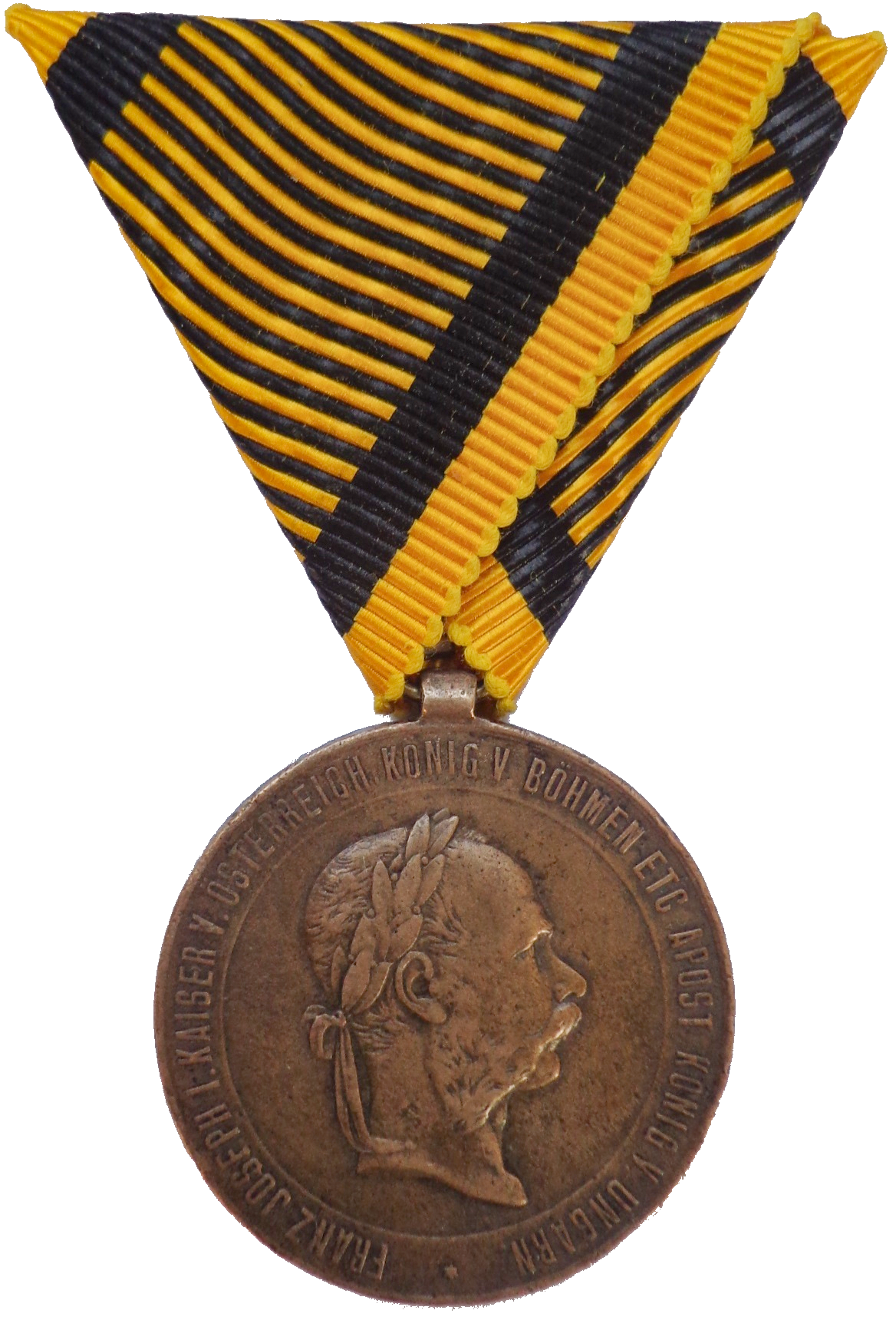
- Country: Austria-Hungary
- Status: No longer awarded
- Established: 2 December 1873
- Ribbon bar of the medal

Precedence
- Next (higher): Wound Medal (Austria-Hungary)
- Next (lower): Commemorative Medal for the 1864 Campaign in Denmark

The War Medal 1873 (German: Kriegsmedaille) was a military medal of Austria-Hungary established in 1873 and awarded for the occasion of Emperor Franz Joseph I. 25th anniversary of his reign and could be awarded to all military personnel of the Austro-Hungarian Armed Forces that took part in one or more campaigns in the years 1848, 1849, 1859, 1864, 1866, 1869, 1878, 1882, as well as in the military operations during the Chinese Boxer Rebellions from 1900 to 1901, have participated.

== History ==
The medal was made from the bronze of captured guns. The obverse shows the head turned to the right of Emperor Franz Joseph I. Circumferential FRANZ JOSEPH I. EMPEROR OF AUSTRIA, KING OF BOHEMIA ETC. APOST. KING OF HUNGARY. The three-part inscription 2. DECEMBER 1873.

The ribbon is hatched horizontally in yellow and black, bordered by a black side stripe and finished with a yellow edge stripe. The award was worn on the triangular ribbon on the left breast. During the First World War the medal was not awarded.
