= 1908 Jubilee Cross =

Austria-Hungary military and cilvil award

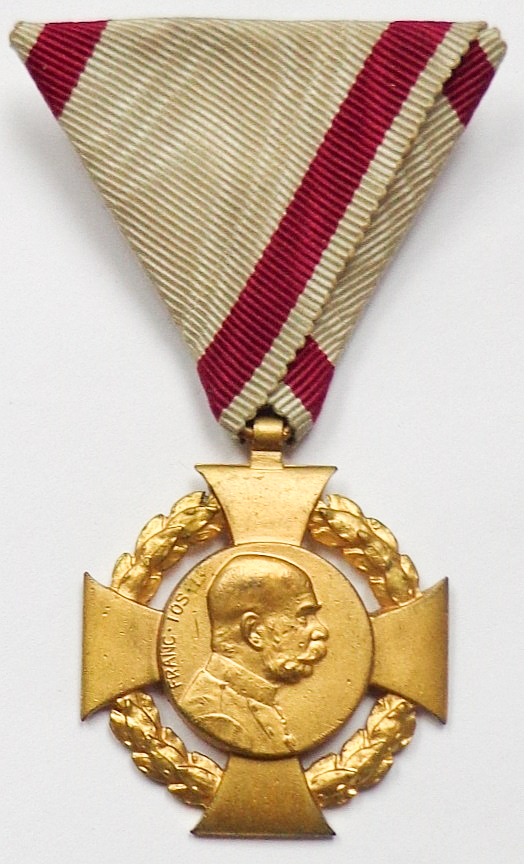
- 1908 Military Jubilee Cross
- Presented by: Austria-Hungary
- Status: No longer awarded
- Established: 2 December 1908
- Ribbon bars of the decoration

Precedence
- Next (higher): 1898 Jubilee Medal
- Next (lower): Bosnia-Hercegovina Commemorative Medal

The 1908 Jubilee Cross (German: Jubiläumskreuz 1908) was a military and civil decoration of Austria-Hungary established in 1908 and awarded for the anniversary of Emperor Franz Josef accession to the throne of the Habsburg Empire.

== History ==
The 1908 Jubilee Cross was created by Emperor Franz Josef on 2 December 1908 in order to commemorative medal the mark the 60th anniversary of his accession to the throne of the Habsburg Empire

The cross was created by Professor Rudolf Marschall (1873-1967) of the Hofkammer, the Imperial Finance Ministry. The cross pattée was 37 mm in diameter. The obverse of the cross bore the portrait of Emperor Franz Josef. On the reverse is written 1848-1908. The cross is suspended from a trifold ribbon.

The cross came in three versions:

- Military Jubilee Cross for the armed forces - Militär-Jubiläumskreuz für Angehörige der bewaffneten Macht
- Jubilee Cross for the Imperial and Royal Court Officials - Juliläums-Hofkreuz für Angehörige des k.u.k. Hofstaates
- Jubilee Cross for Civil Servants - Jubliäumskreuz für Zivilstaatsbedienstete für zivile Beamte
