= Decoration for Services to the Red Cross =

Austro-Hungarian emergency services award

Decoration for Services to the Red Cross Ehrenzeichen für Verdienste um das Rote Kreuz
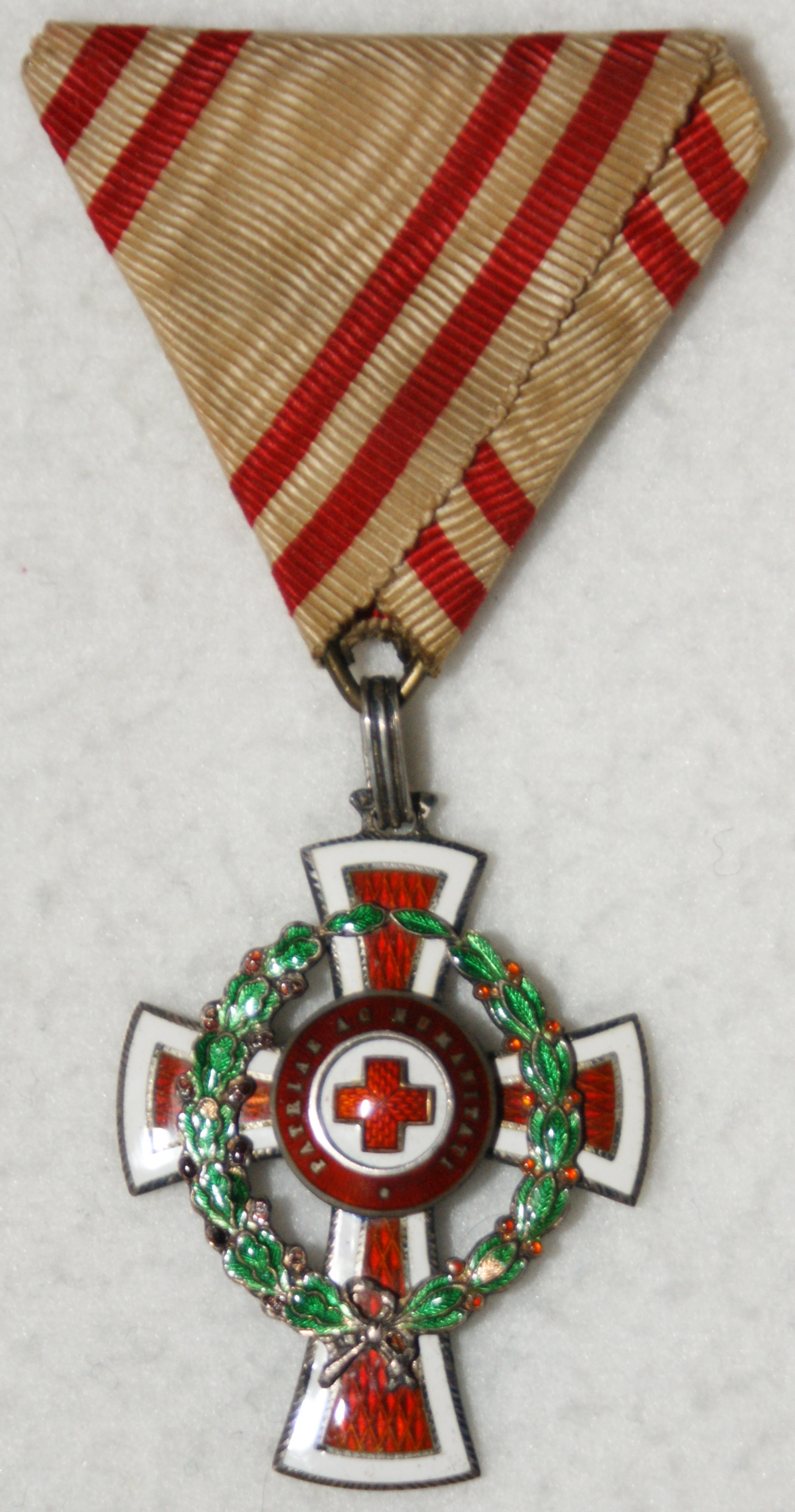
- Decoration for Services to the Red Cross, 2nd class, with war decoration
- Type: Military decoration
- Presented by: Austria-Hungary
- Eligibility: Individuals who worked in the voluntary emergency services of the Red Cross
- Established: 17 August 1914
- Ribbon of the decoration

Precedence
- Next (higher): Military Long Service Crosses
- Next (lower): 1898 Jubilee Medal

The Decoration for Services to the Red Cross (Ehrenzeichen für Verdienste um das Rote Kreuz) was an Austro-Hungarian award instituted on 17 August 1914 by Emperor Franz Joseph I to mark the 50th anniversary of the Geneva Convention. It was intended to honour individuals who had worked in the voluntary emergency services of the Red Cross, either in peacetime or in war.

The order consists of four classes, as well as an associated medal in two classes:

1. Star
2. Merit Cross, 1st class
3. Officer's Cross
4. Merit Cross, 2nd class
  - Silver Medal
  - Bronze Medal

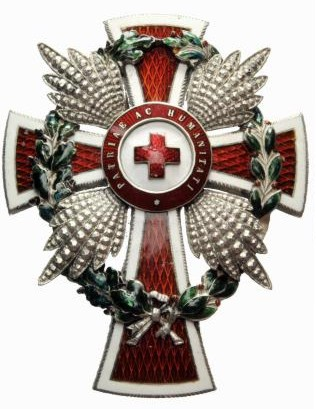
Decoration for Services to the Red Cross Star

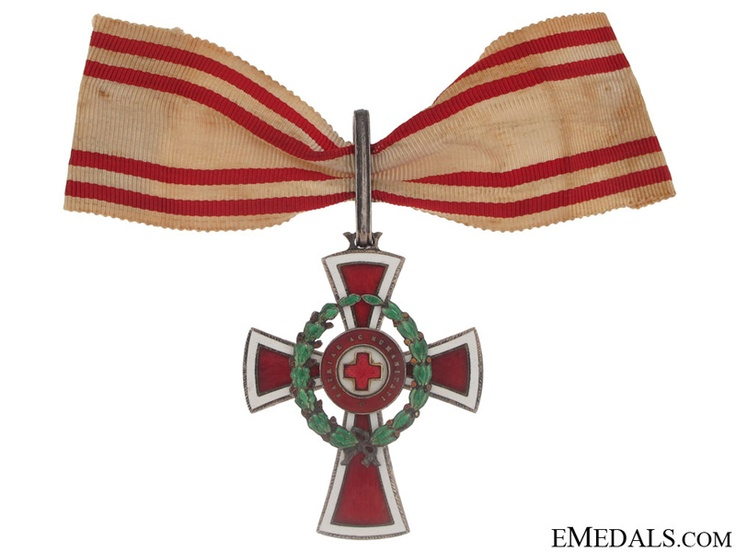
Decoration for Services to the Red Cross, 1st Class with war decoration

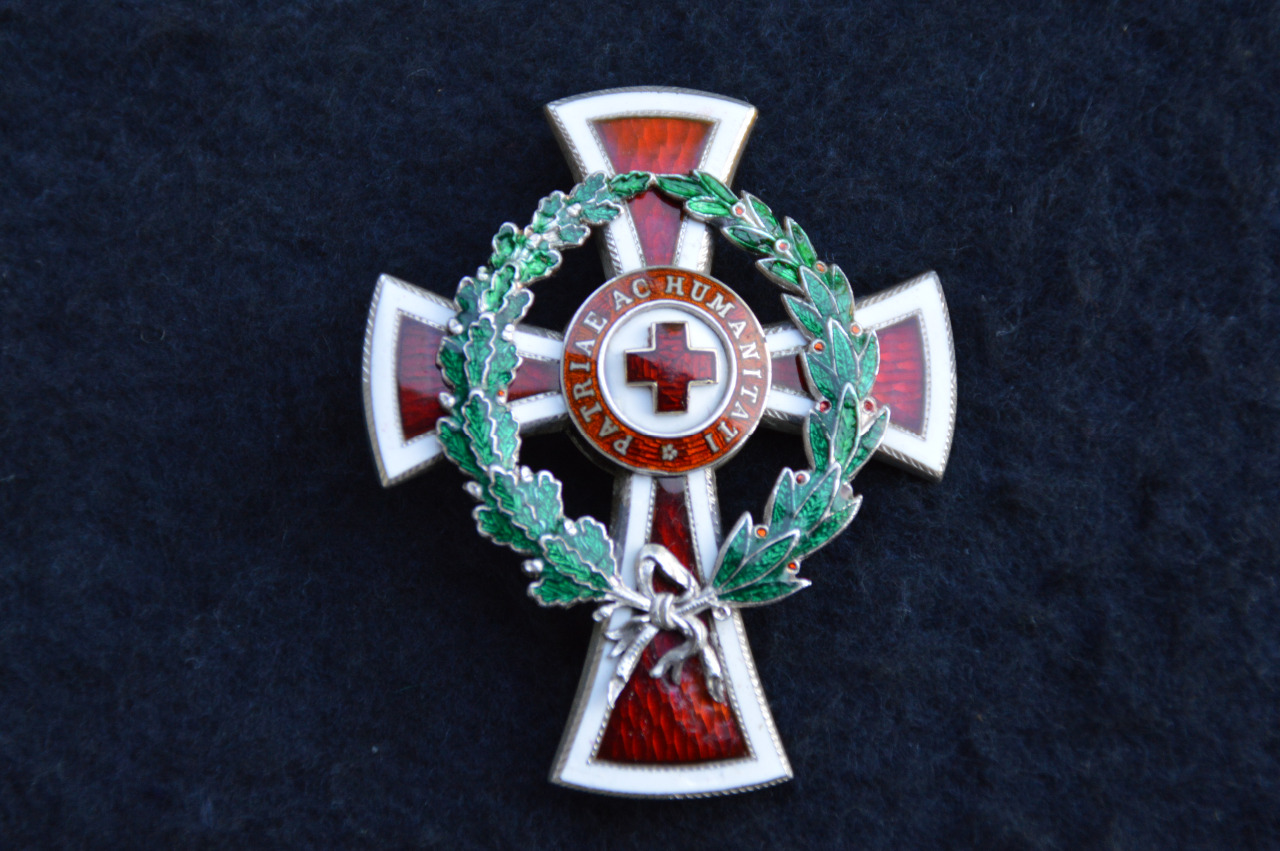
Decoration for Services to the Red Cross, Officers Cross

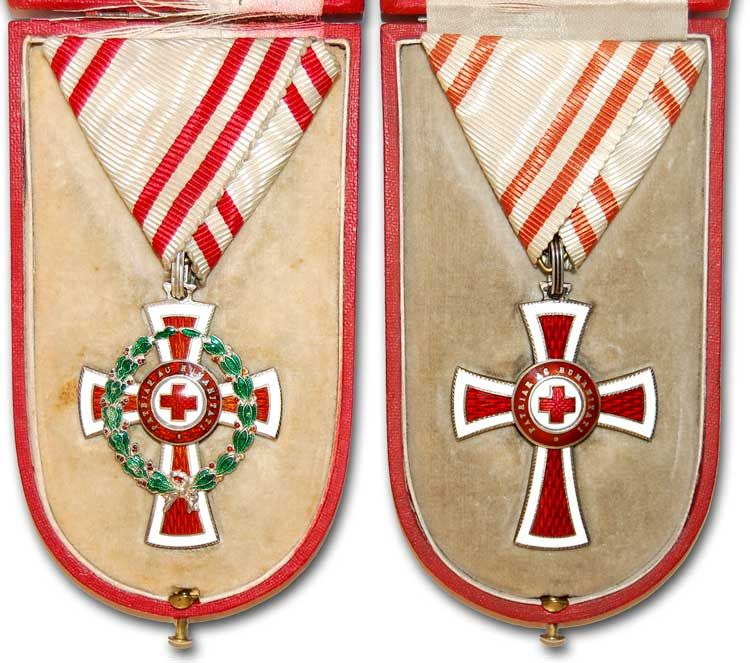
Decoration for Services to the Red Cross, 2nd Class with war decoration, and without

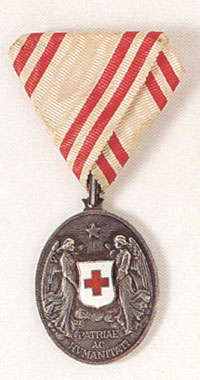
Decoration for Services to the Red Cross, Silver Medal

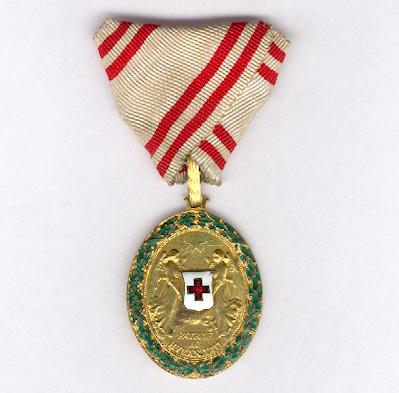
Decoration for Services to the Red Cross, Bronze Medal with war decoration

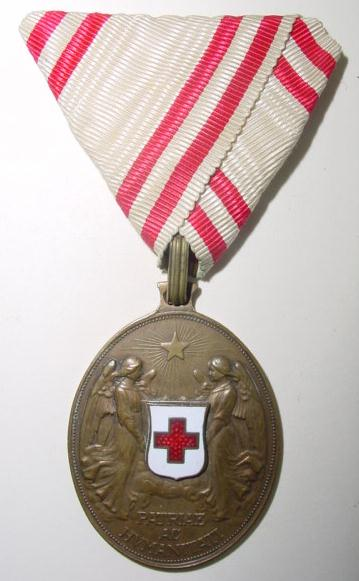
Decoration for Services to the Red Cross, Bronze Medal

Awards for military services were augmented with a war decoration for the ceremony.
