= Bosnia-Hercegovina Commemorative Medal =

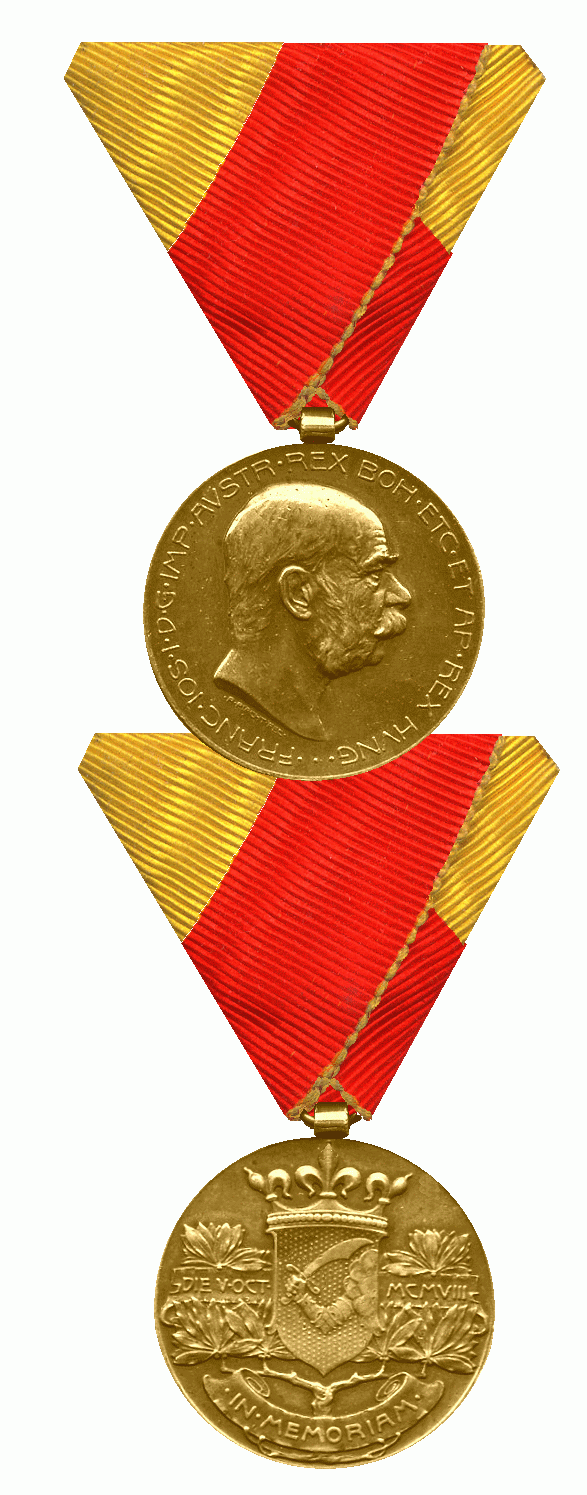
- Country: Austria-Hungary
- Status: No longer awarded
- Established: 30 August 1909
- Ribbon bar of the medal

Precedence
- Next (higher): 1908 Jubilee Cross
- Next (lower): Mobilization Cross 1912/13

The Bosnia-Hercegovina Commemorative Medal (German: Bosnisch-Hercegovinische Erinnerungsmedaille) was founded on 30 August 1909, to commemorate the annexation of Bosnia and Herzegovina into the Austro-Hungarian Monarchy in 1908. Bosnia and Herzegovina itself had been occupied by the dual monarchy of Austria-Hungary since 1878. Legally, however, it remained part of the Ottoman Empire until 1908, when it was annexed by the empire as a condominium between Austria and Hungary. The exact number of awards is uncertain because it was awarded not only to soldiers, but also to civil officials. The number is believed to be approximately 2800.

== Physical Description ==
The medal was minted in bronze. On the obverse there is a portrait of Emperor Franz Joseph I, with the Latin inscription FRANC · IOS · I · D · G · IMP · AVSTR · REX BOH · ETC · ET AP · REX HVNG, in English: Francis Joseph I by the Grace of God, Emperor of Austria, King of Bohemia, etc, and Apostolic King of Hungary. On the reverse, on a stylized laurel tree, rests the coat of arms of Bosnia and Herzegovina with a lily crown. In the crown of the tree there is a thin strip on each side with the inscription DIE V · OCT · MCMVIII, and on the trunk of the tree on an oblique ribbon IN · MEMORIAM.
