= Wound Medal (Austria-Hungary) =

Wound Medal (Verwundetenmedaille, Sebesültek Érme)
- Obverse of Wound Medal with ribbon for 5 wounds
- Type: Military medal
- Description: Zinc medal with bust of Emperor Karl on the obverse and the words LAESO MILITI and the date MCMXVIII on the reverse, suspended from a trifold ribbon.
- Country: Austria-Hungary
- Eligibility: Soldiers and civilians attached to Austro-Hungarian military units who were wounded in combat, became disabled or suffered serious health damage in connection with military actions.
- Campaign(s): World War I
- Status: Obsolete
- Established: August 12, 1917
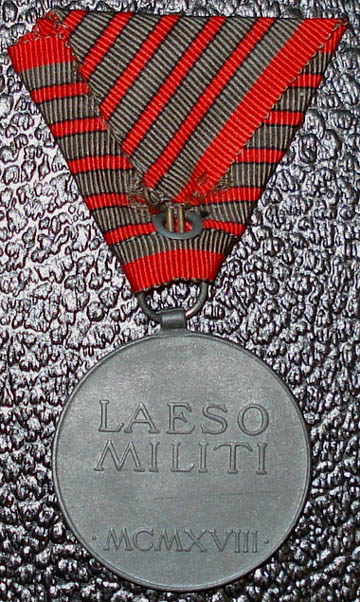
- Reverse of the Wound Medal

Precedence
- Next (higher): Karl Troop Cross
- Next (lower): War Medal 1873

The Wound Medal (German: Verwundetenmedaille, Hungarian: Sebesültek Érme, Croatian: Ranjenička medalja) was a decoration of the Empire of Austria-Hungary. It was established on August 12, 1917, by Emperor Karl and was the last medal to be officially founded in the empire.

The Wound Medal was awarded to service members of the Austro-Hungarian armed forces and to persons attached to the Austro-Hungarian armed forces who were wounded as a result of combat operations. Besides wounded persons, it was also awarded to persons who were disabled or suffered serious damage to their health in connection with military actions.

== Description ==
The medal was made of zinc, and measured 38-mm in diameter. The zinc surface was dull gray, but examples with a polished surface often appear.

The obverse of the medal featured a bust of Emperor Karl with his name in Latin "CAROLUS" above and a wreath of laurels below. Between the bust and the laurels in smaller letters was the name of the designer of the medal, R.(Richard) PLACHT, 1880 Kratzau - 1962 Vienna. The reverse featured the words LAESO MILITI ("to the wounded soldier") and the date in Roman numerals "MCMXVIII" (1918).

The medal was suspended from a typical Austrian-style trifold ribbon, 39-mm in width. The ribbon was gray-green with 4-mm wide red edge stripes. The number of wounds was indicated by narrower 2-mm wide red stripes, edged in black, centered on the ribbon. No stripes indicated an award for someone invalided out of service. One stripe indicated a single wound, two stripes two wounds, etc.

For the Disabled (No Stripe)	1 Stripe	2 Stripes	3 Stripes	4 Stripes	5 Stripes
