= Mobilization Cross 1912/13 =

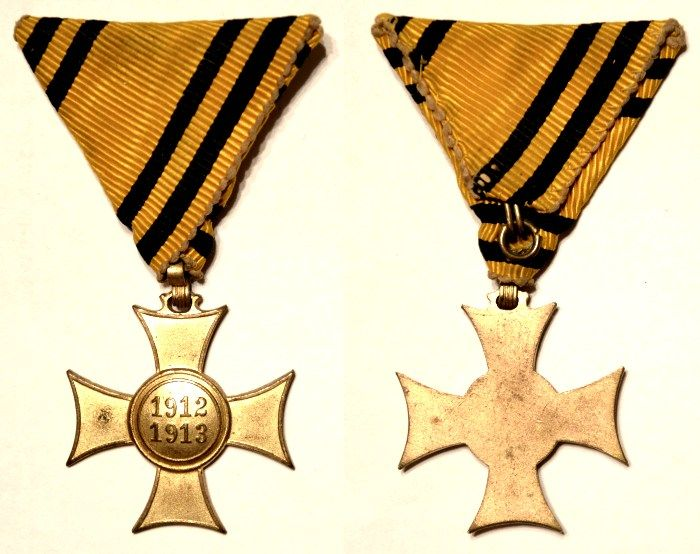
- Country: Austria-Hungary
- Status: No longer awarded
- Established: 9 June 1913
- Ribbon bar of the cross

Precedence
- Next (higher): Bosnia-Hercegovina Commemorative Medal
- Next (lower): Sea Voyage Medal 1892–1893

The Mobilization Cross 1912/13 (German: Erinnerungskreuz 1912/13), also simply referred to as the Mobilization Cross, was awarded to members of the Austro-Hungarian Armed Forces who had been called up for actual military service during the 1912 mobilization due to the First Balkan War, and had served at least four weeks. Due to the threat of war at that time, the Austro-Hungarian Empire was forced to make preparations with a partial mobilization. After demobilization the soldiers received the cross as a remembrance. The mobilization affected virtually every unit in the army. About one million medals were awarded.
