= 1898 Jubilee Medal =

Austria-Hungary military and cilvil award

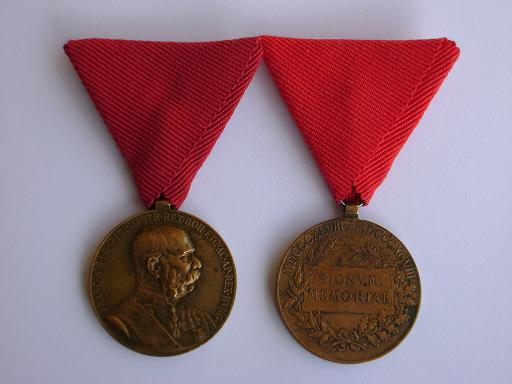
- Bronze Military Jubilee Medal for the Armed Forces
- Country: Austria-Hungary
- Status: No longer awarded
- Established: 2 December 1898
- Ribbons of the medal

Precedence
- Next (higher): Bronze medal of the Decoration for Services to the Red Cross
- Next (lower): 1908 Jubilee Cross

The 1898 Jubilee Medal (German: Jubiläums-Erinnerungsmedaille 1898, also known as Signum Memoriae) was a military and civil decoration of Austria-Hungary established in 1898 and awarded for the anniversary of Emperor Franz Josef's accession to the throne of the Habsburg Empire.

== History ==
=== General ===
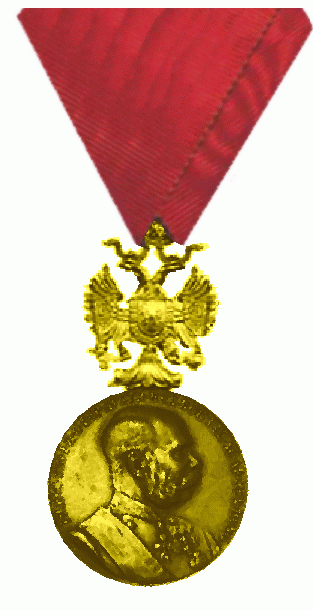
1898 Golden Jubilee Medal for 50 years of service

The 1898 Jubilee Medal was created by Emperor Franz Josef on 2 December 1898 in order to commemorate the 50th anniversary of his accession to the throne of the Habsburg Empire

The medal was 34–35 mm in diameter. The golden Jubilee medal had an eagle on top. The obverse of the medal bore the portrait of Emperor Franz Josef. On the reverse is written MDCCCXLLVIII-MDCCCXCVIII (1848–1898) in a laurel wreath. The medal is suspended from a red trifold ribbon for the armed forces, a red and white for civilians, and a white ribbon with a wide red stripe for Court officials. It was possible to receive both military and civilian versions of the medal if the recipient was both a civilian state official and, for example, an officer in the reserve.

The civilian version and the one for military personnel had different inscriptions around the obverse:

Civilian version: FRANC•IOS•I•D•G•IMP•AVSTR•REX•BOH•ETC•REX•AP•HVNG.

Military version: FRANC•IOS•I•D•G•IMP•AVSTR•REX•BOH•ETC•AC•AP•REX•HVNG.

=== Ribbons ===
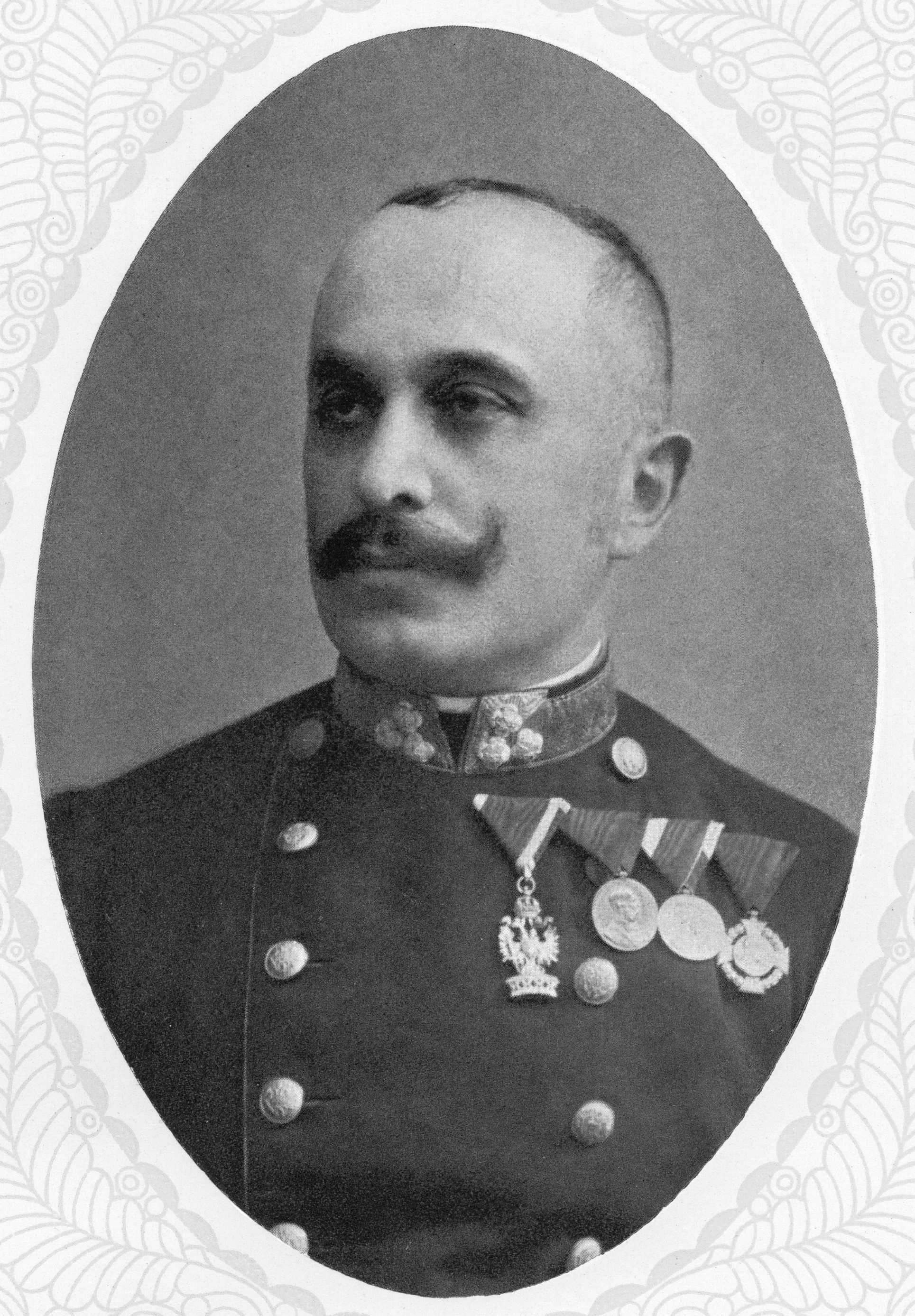
Demeter Ritter von Tuschinski, Prosecutor in Czernowitz, wearing a civilian and a military version as he was an officer in the reserve, as well.

The medal came in four versions:

- Jubilee Court Medal – Jubiläums-Hofmedaille
- Gold Jubilee Medal for the Armed Forces – Goldene Jubiläums-Erinnerungsmedaille für die bewaffnete Macht und die Gendarmerie
- Bronze Jubilee Medal for the Armed Forces – Jubiläums-Erinnerungsmedaille für die bewaffnete Macht und die Gendarmerie
- Jubilee Medal for Civilian Servants – Jubiläums-Erinnerungsmedaille für Zivilstaatsbedienstete
