= Medal for Bravery (Austria-Hungary) =

Medal for Bravery Tapferkeitsmedaille
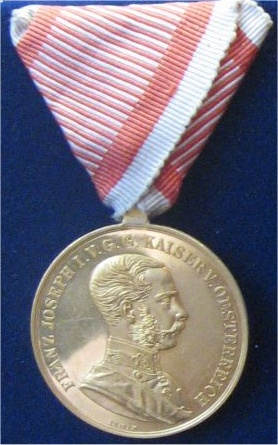
- Golden Medal for Bravery, 1866 to 1917 version
- Awarded for: Bravery in combat
- Description: Gold Bravery Medal; Silver Bravery Medal (1st Class); Silver Bravery Medal (2nd Class); Bronze Bravery Medal
- Country: Austria-Hungary
- Status: No longer awarded after the fall of Austria-Hungary
- Established: 19 July 1789
- Final award: 1918
- Ribbon bar of the medal

Precedence
- Next (higher): Decoration of the Elizabeth-Theresian Military Foundation
- Next (lower): Iron Cross of Merit

The Medal for Bravery (German: Tapferkeitsmedaille, Hungarian: Vitézségi Érem) was a military decoration of Austria-Hungary established in 1789 and awarded for bravery in battle until the dissolution of the Austro-Hungarian Empire in 1918.

== History ==
=== Habsburg Empire 1789-1918 ===
The Medal for Bravery was created by Emperor Joseph II on 19 July 1789 in order to recognize courage in combat by personnel below commissioned rank (courageous acts performed by commissioned officers could after 1757 be rewarded by appointment to the Military Order of Maria Theresa). From 1789 to 1915, the Medal for Bravery existed in three classes: Golden Medal for Bravery, Silver Medal for Bravery 1st Class and Silver Medal for Bravery 2nd Class. The latter honour was similar in design to the Golden Medal and the Silver Medal 1st Class, but considerably smaller.

A fourth class, the Bronze Medal for Bravery, was introduced on 14 February 1915 during World War I. It was the same size as the Silver Medal 2nd Class.

Bars denoting subsequent awards within the same class were introduced on 29 November 1915.

All versions of the Medal for Bravery bore the portrait of the reigning monarch on the obverse and the inscription "Der Tapferkeit" ("To Bravery") on the reverse. Medals awarded during World War I were minted with the portrait of Emperor Franz Josef on the obverse until some months after his death. Starting in April 1917, the visage of his successor, Emperor Charles I, was substituted.

On 26 September 1917, Emperor Charles I amended the statutes of the Medal for Bravery and decreed that the Golden Medal for Bravery and the Silver Medal for Bravery 1st Class could now also be awarded to commissioned officers, particularly in cases where their services were not sufficient for the Military Order of Maria Theresa. Commissioned officers wore the same medals as the ranks, plus the letter "K" (in gold or silver, depending on class of the award) superimposed on the triangular ribbon.

The medal was never awarded with swords.

Number of medals minted during World War I: 3,700 Gold 143,000 Silver, 1st Class 384,000 Silver, 2nd Class 950,000 Bronze

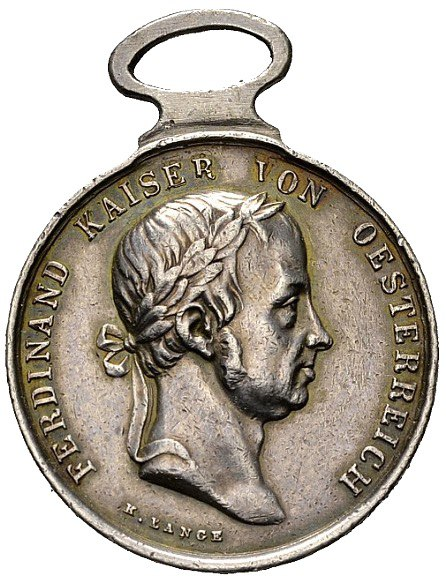
Obverse Silver Medal for Bravery, 1839 to 1849, Ferdinand I of Austria

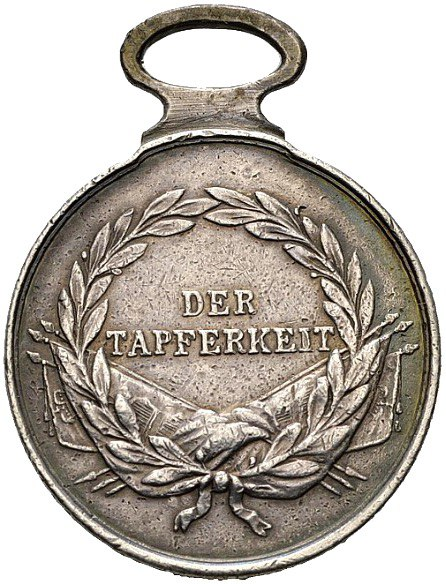
Reverse Silver Medal for Bravery, 1839 to 1849, Ferdinand I of Austria

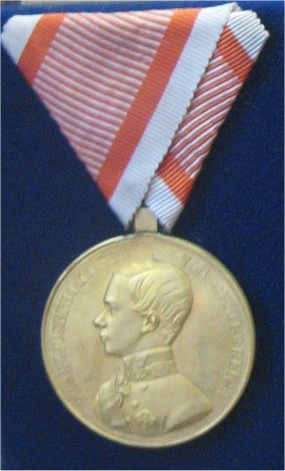
Golden Medal for Bravery, 1848 to 1859 version, Franz Joseph I of Austria

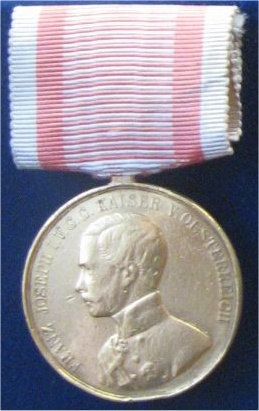
Golden Medal for Bravery, 1859 to 1866 version, Franz Joseph I of Austria

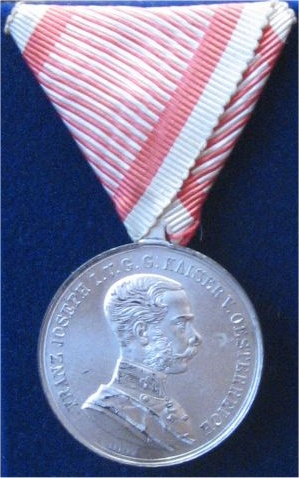
Silver Medal for Bravery 1st Class, Franz Joseph I of Austria

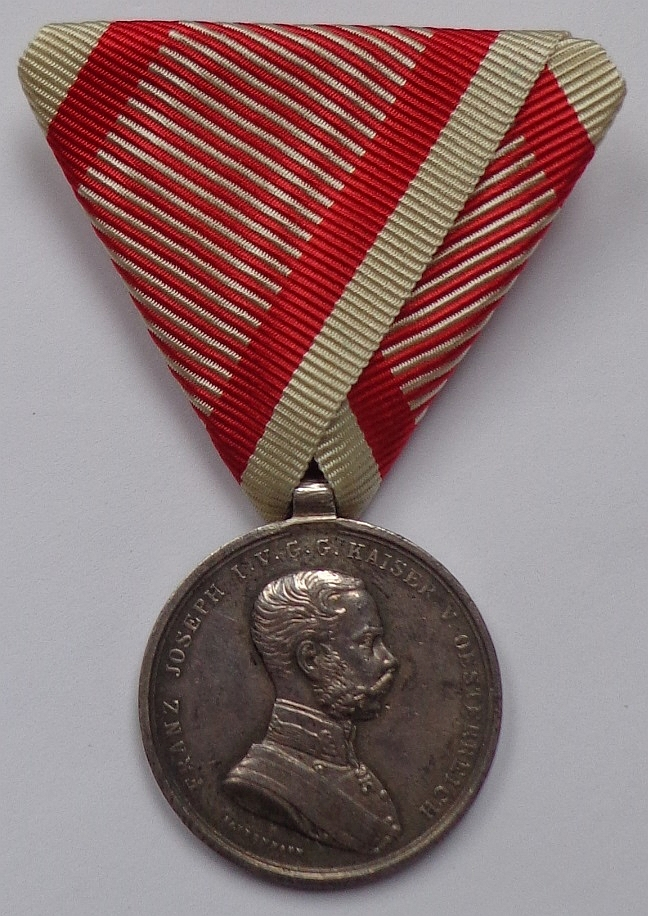
Silver Medal for Bravery 2nd Class, Franz Joseph I of Austria

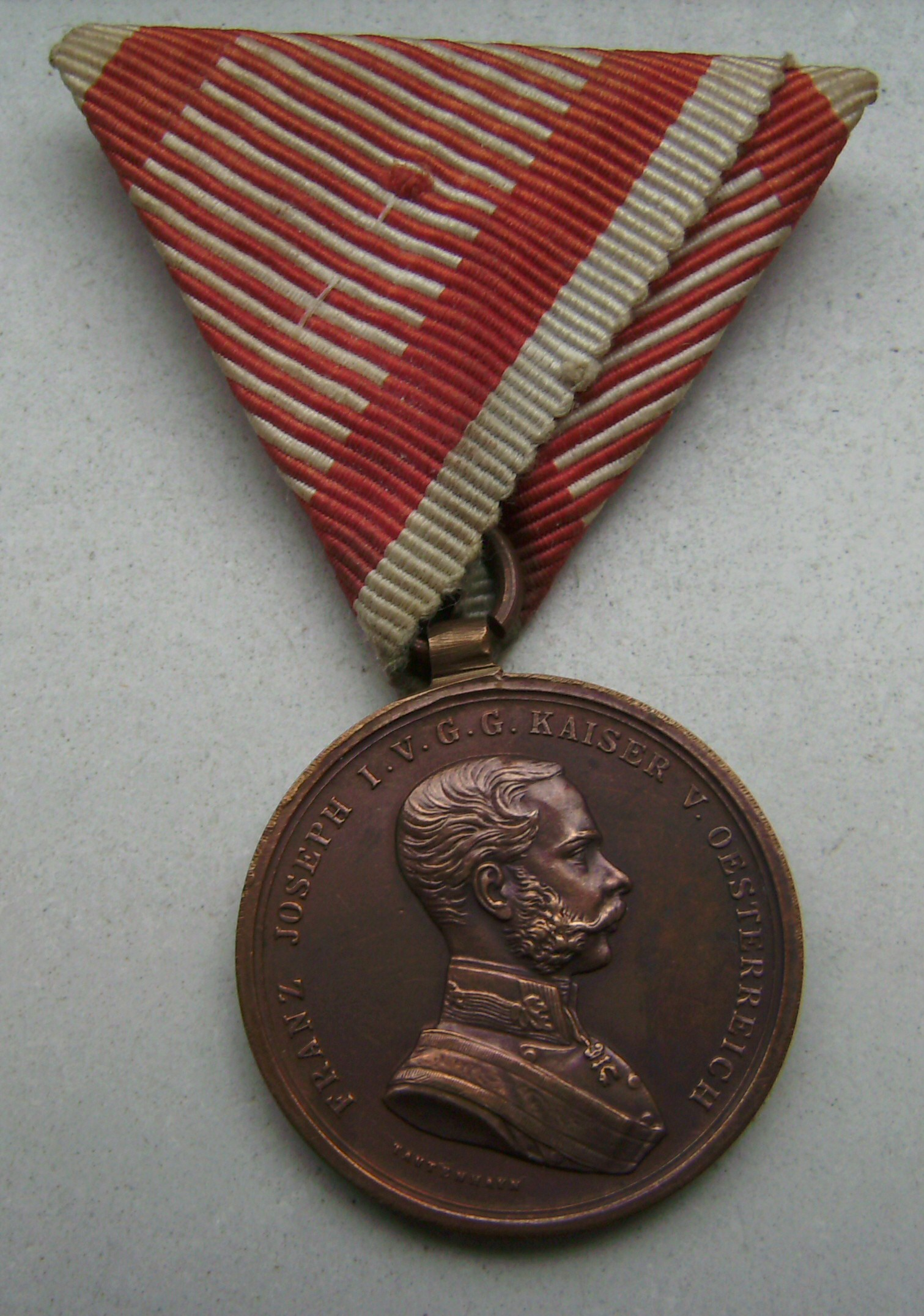
Bronze Medal for Bravery, Franz Joseph I of Austria

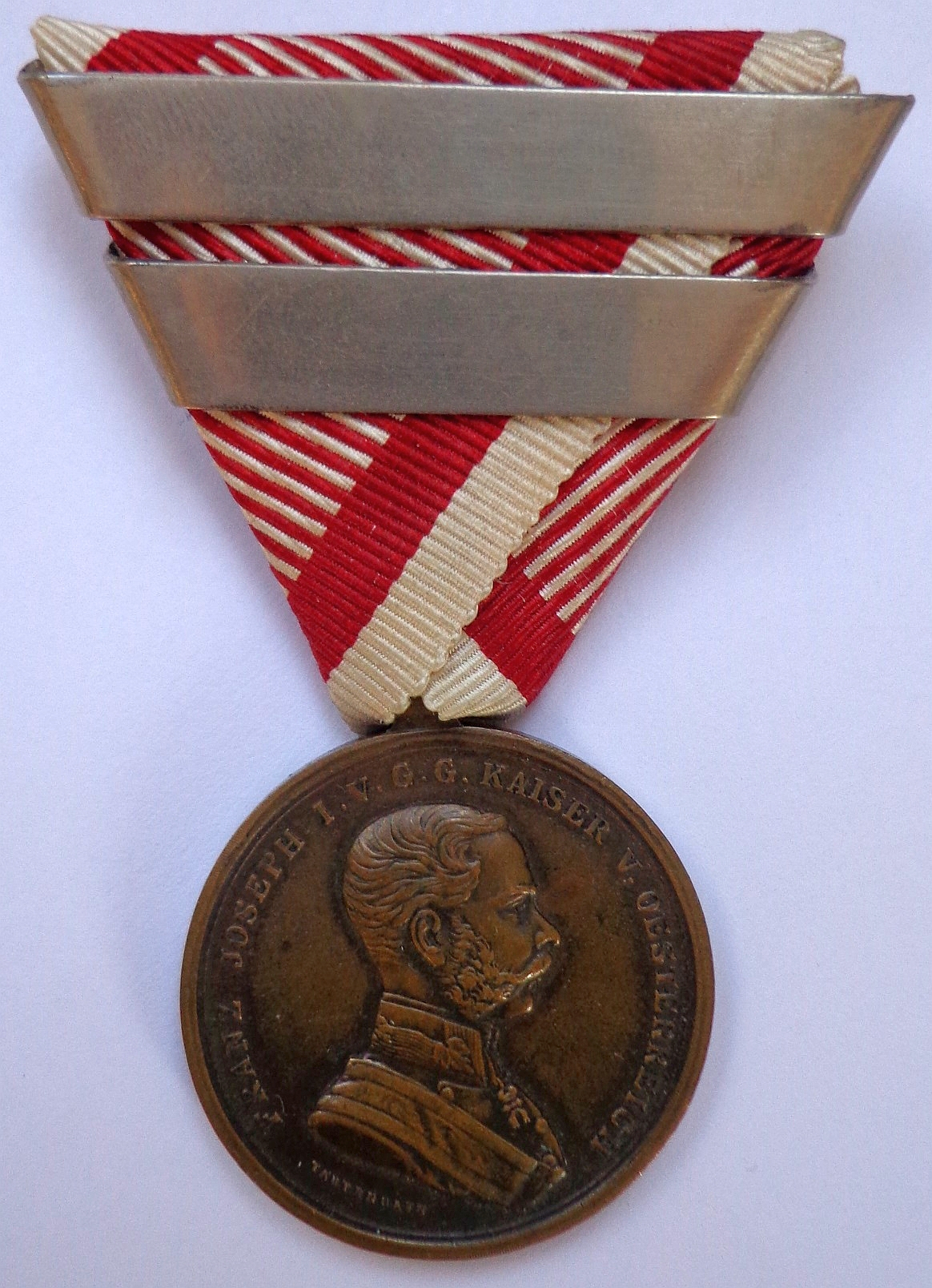
Bronze Medal for Bravery with two Bars (indicating three awards), Franz Joseph I of Austria

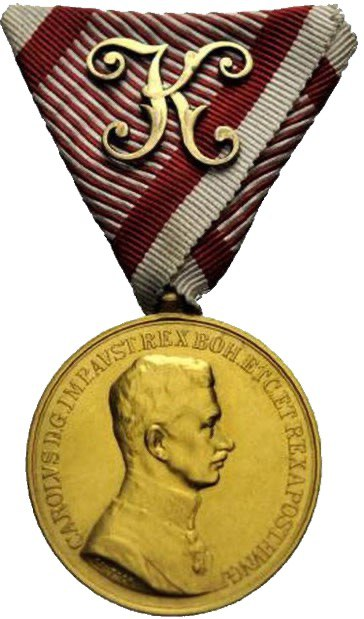
Golden Medal for Bravery for Officers, 1917 version,Charles I of Austria

=== Kingdom of Hungary 1920–46 ===
After World War I and the dissolution of Austria-Hungary, the newly established Kingdom of Hungary instituted in 1922 the Medal of Bravery in silver only.

By 14 April 1939, gold, large silver, small silver and bronze awards were issued to non-commissioned officers and men and, on 12 September 1942, the gold medal for bravery award (Magyar: Tiszti Arany Vitézségi Érem) for officers was added. A notable recipient was Hans-Ulrich Rudel of the German Luftwaffe.
