= Military Merit Cross (Austria-Hungary) =

Military decoration of Austria-Hungary

Military Merit Cross (Militärverdienstkreuz)
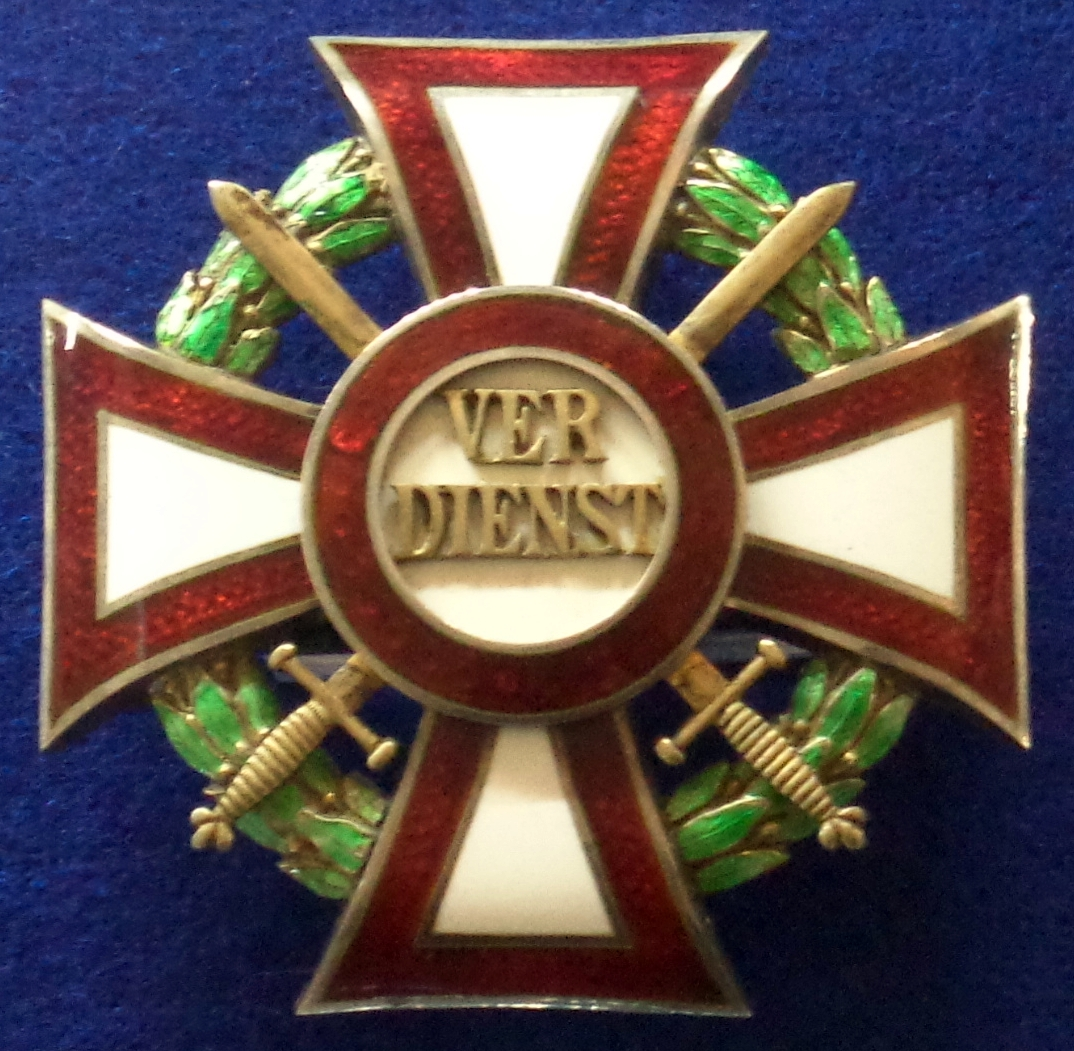
- Military Merit Cross 1st Class with War Decoration and Swords
- Type: Decoration in three classes
- Established: October 22, 1849
- Country: Austria-Hungary
- Eligibility: Military officers only
- Awarded for: Military merit and valor
- Status: No longer awarded
- Grades: Knight Grand Officer; Knight Commander; Knight

Precedence
- Next (higher): Order of the Iron Crown
- Next (lower): War Cross for Civil Merits
- Ribbon of the decoration

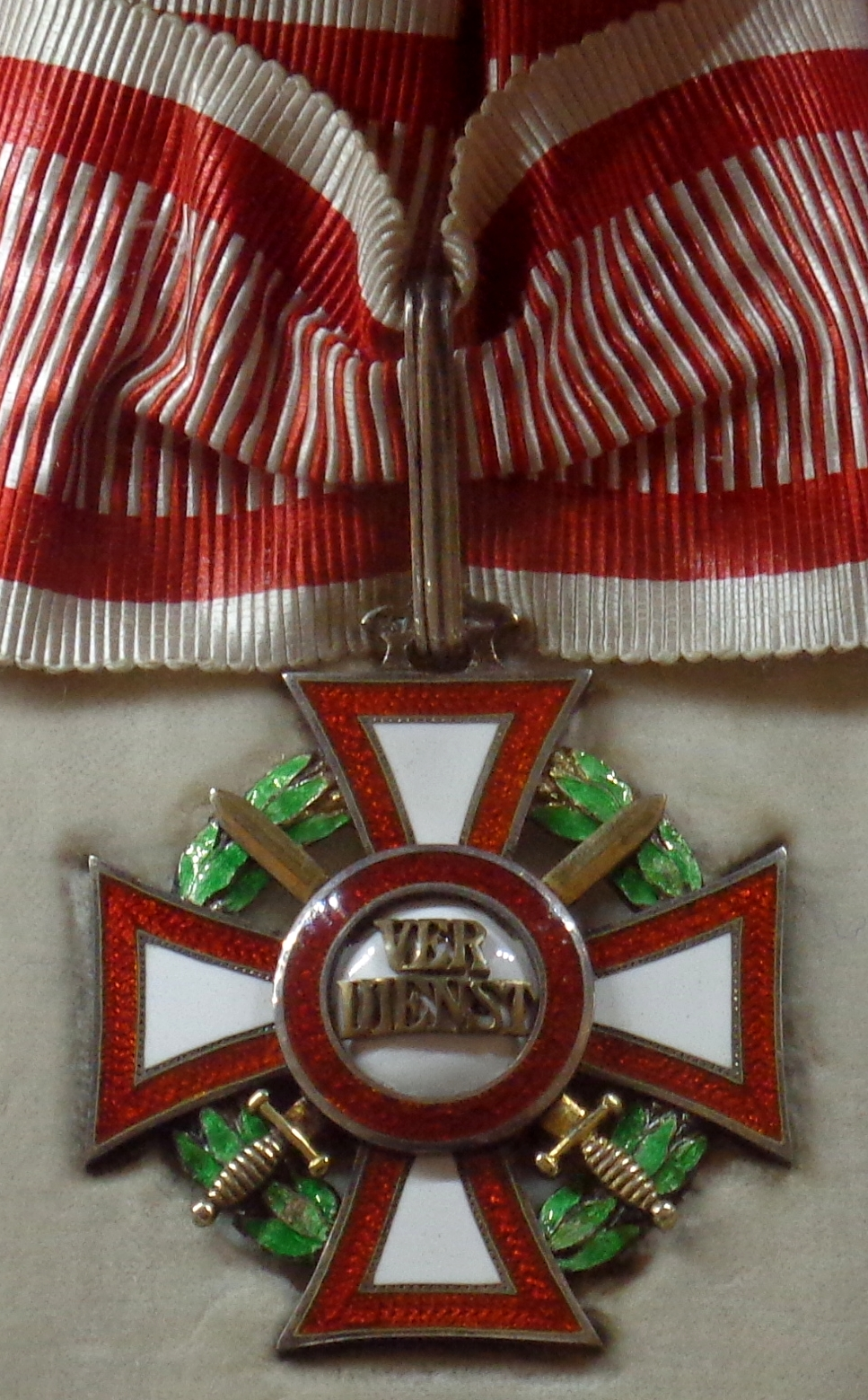
Military Merit Cross 2nd Class with War Decoration and Swords

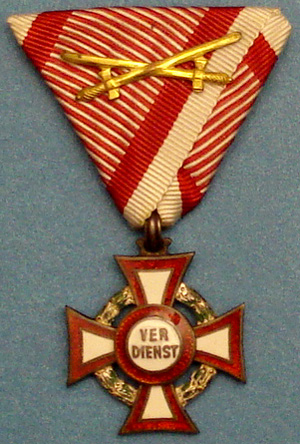
Military Merit Cross 3rd Class with War Decoration and Swords

The Military Merit Cross (German: Militärverdienstkreuz, Hungarian: Katonai Érdemkereszt, Croatian: Vojni križ za zasluge) was a decoration of the Empire of Austria and, after the establishment of the Dual Monarchy in 1867, the Empire of Austria-Hungary. It was first established on October 22, 1849 and underwent several revisions to its design and award criteria over the years of its existence. It became obsolete in 1918 with the dissolution of the Austro-Hungarian Empire.

== History ==
The Military Merit Cross was established on October 22, 1849 by Emperor Franz Joseph I, based on the recommendation of Field Marshal Count Radetzky. It was to be awarded to officers who had performed especially praiseworthy service before the enemy in wartime, or outstanding service in peacetime, and was originally established in only one class.

The first awards were made to all officers who had served under Count Radetzky in the Italian campaigns of 1848-49, especially the Battle of Custoza in 1848 and the Battle of Novara in 1849. Just under 1,500 awards were made in 1849 and 1850, mainly to these officers. After this, the Military Merit Cross was awarded sparingly except during the Austro-Sardinian War of 1859, the German-Danish War of 1864, the Austro-Prussian War of 1866, the Russo-Turkish War of 1877–1878 (when Austria occupied Bosnia-Herzegovina), and the Boxer Rebellion.

The first major revision of the Military Merit Cross came on January 12, 1860, when the War Decoration (Kriegsdekoration) was created. This was a green laurel wreath (Lorbeerkranz) between the arms of the cross, which was awarded for special deeds before the enemy ("für besondere Taten vor dem Feind"). Henceforth (and retroactively), wartime awards would be distinguished from peacetime awards by the presence of the wreath.

The next significant change occurred on September 23, 1914, shortly after the outbreak of World War I. The Military Merit Cross was divided into three classes. The previous Military Merit Cross, a breast decoration worn on a trifold ribbon, became the 3rd Class. A neck badge was created as the 2nd Class and a pinback cross became the new 1st Class. This classification made the Military Merit Cross effectively an order, with the 3rd Class equivalent to a knight's badge, the 2nd Class equivalent to a commander's badge, and the 1st Class equivalent to the breast star of an order. A recipient of an earlier Military Merit Cross without the War Decoration, if awarded the Military Merit Cross with the War Decoration, could wear both, and a recipient of a higher class could continue to wear the lower class. The statutes allowed for all three classes to be awarded with or without the War Decoration, but given the wartime situation, most awards were with the War Decoration.

Another change occurred on December 13, 1916, when swords were authorized for awards for bravery. These were crossed swords on the ribbon for the 3rd Class, and between the arms of the cross for the 1st and 2nd Class. On August 1, 1917, second and third awards of the 3rd Class were authorized, signified by one or two 6-mm wide silver clasps on the ribbon. On February 8, 1918, a second award of the 2nd Class was also authorized.

Until World War I, awards to non-Austro-Hungarian officers were uncommon. A number of Saxon officers received the Military Merit Cross in the Austro-Prussian War. Two Bavarians and one Saxon were decorated for their service in the Boxer Rebellion. During World War I, awards to officers of Austria-Hungary's allies became far more common, especially to Germans serving alongside Austro-Hungarians or serving in regiments of which the Emperor was the honorary chief.

From the earliest days of the decoration, the Austrian Emperor also reserved the right to make awards of the Military Merit Cross with Diamonds. This was not a special class, but a token of esteem. Most recipients were senior Austro-Hungarian generals and admirals, although a number were awarded during World War I to high-ranking allies.

== Description ==
The Military Merit Cross is a cross pattée of white enamel edged in red enamel, with a center medallion also of white enamel edged in red enamel, on which the word "VERDIENST" (merit) appears, broken into "VER" and "DIENST" to fit the center. The War Decoration is a green enamel wreath of laurel leaves between the arms of the cross.

The 3rd Class is suspended from a trifold ribbon. The ribbon is that of the Austrian Bravery Medal, a "laddered" pattern of red stripes with white between the "rungs" and a white border (this ribbon was also used for wartime awards of a number of other Austro-Hungarian decorations). The cross is approximately 30-mm in width, with the arms broadening to a width of 15-mm. The center medallion is approximately 13-mm in diameter. The War Decoration wreath, which during World War I was more likely gilt rather than green, is 3-mm wide.

The 2nd Class is suspended from a neck ribbon of the same design as for the 3rd Class. The cross is approximately 40-mm wide, with the center medallion having a diameter of 19-mm. The War Decoration wreath is 6-mm wide.

The 1st Class is a pinback cross worn on the lower left breast. It is approximately 61-mm in width, with the arms broadening to 27-mm at the ends. The center medallion is also 27-mm in width. The War Decoration wreath is 7-mm wide.

== Notable recipients ==
- Prince Albert of Prussia (1837–1906) - Prussian field marshal and regent of the Duchy of Brunswick (1864)
- Johann von Appel - Austrian general and governor of Bosnia-Herzegovina (MVK with War Decoration in 1849, Diamonds in 1898)
- Mustafa Kemal Atatürk - Ottoman colonel in early period of World War I; later Mareşal, President and founder of the Republic of Turkey (3rd Class with War Decoration 1916)
- Friedrich von Beck-Rzikowsky (March 21, 1830 – February 9, 1920), Austrian field marshal and chief of the general staff of the Imperial and Royal Army of Austria-Hungary (1881–1906)
- Fedor von Bock - German Generalfeldmarschall (3rd Class with War Decoration 24 June 1914)
- Wilhelm Burgdorf- (15 February 1895 – 2 May 1945), was a German general in the Wehrmacht during World War II, who served as a commander and staff officer in the German Army (Wehrmacht) (army) and Chief Adjutant to Adolf Hitler.
- Carol I of Romania - King of Romania (1864)
- Engelbert Dollfuss - Austrian Chancellor and veteran of the Great War.
- Archduke Eugen of Austria - Austrian general (1st Class with War Decoration 1915, Swords and Diamonds 1917)
- Gheorghe Flondor - Ethnic-Romanian captain in the Austro-Hungarian army
- Archduke Friedrich, Duke of Teschen - Austro-Hungarian field marshal in World War I (1st Class with War Decoration 1915)
- Hermann Geyer – German general staff officer in World War I, later a general during World War II (3rd Class with War Decoration)
- Leo Geyr von Schweppenburg – German cavalry officer in World War I, later a general during World War II (3rd Class with War Decoration)
- Konrad Grallert von Cebrów - (March 27, 1865 – 1942) was a divisional commander in the Austro-Hungarian Army
- Hans Heinrich XV, Prince of Pless, German officer
- Gotthard Heinrici - German officer in World War I, later a general in World War II (3rd Class with War Decoration)
- Paul von Hindenburg - German Generalfeldmarschall in World War I (3rd Class with War Decoration 1914, Diamonds 1915, 1st Class with War Decoration 1917)
- Hans Georg Hofmann - Bavarian Major in World War I, later SA-Obergruppenführer
- Miklós Horthy - Austro-Hungarian naval officer, later Regent of Hungary (3rd Class with War Decoration)
- Archduke Joseph August of Austria - Austro-Hungarian field marshal in World War I (1st Class with War Decoration 1916)
- Erich Ludendorff - German general in World War I (1st Class with War Decoration 1917)
- August von Mackensen - German field marshal in World War I (1st Class with War Decoration and Diamonds 1915)
- Erich von Manstein - German officer in World War I, later a field marshal in World War II (3rd Class with War Decoration 1916)
- Erwin Rommel - German officer in World War I, later a field marshal in World War II (3rd Class with War Decoration and Swords)
- Ferdinand Schörner - German officer in World War I, later a field marshal in World War II (3rd Class with War Decoration 1916)
- August Stramm - Imperial German Army officer and war poet
- Wilhelm Ritter von Thoma - German officer in World War I, later a general in World War II (3rd Class with War Decoration 1916)
- Georg von Trapp- (4 April 1880 – 30 May 1947), Baron Corvette Captain was an Austro-Hungarian Navy officer.
