= Military Merit Medal (Austria-Hungary) =

Military Merit Medal (Signum Laudis) Militär-Verdienstmedaille (Signum Laudis)
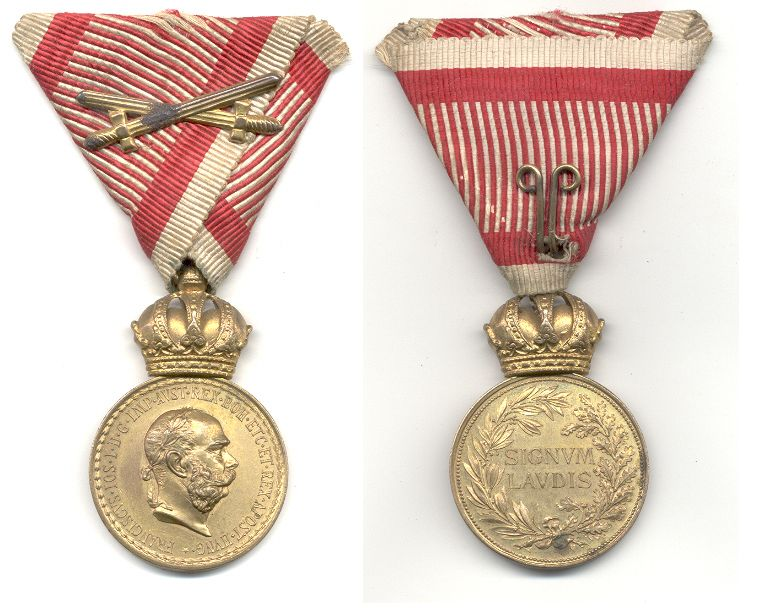
- Bronze Military Merit Medal on the War Ribbon with Swords, Franz Joseph I
- Type: Military decoration
- Awarded for: Military merit
- Description: Grand Military Merit Medal; Silver Military Merit Medal; Bronze Military Merit Medal
- Country: Austria-Hungary
- Eligibility: Austro-Hungarian officers and officials of similar rank
- Status: No longer awarded
- Established: March 12, 1890
- | Ribbons awarded with the medal during peacetime and wartime

Precedence
- Next (higher): Merit Cross for Military Chaplains
- Next (lower): Medal for Bravery

The Military Merit Medal (German: Militär-Verdienstmedaille, Hungarian: Katonai Érdemérem, Croatian: Vojna medalja za zasluge) was a military decoration of the Empire of Austria-Hungary. It was founded by Emperor Franz Joseph I on March 12, 1890. The Military Merit Medal is often referred to as the "Signum Laudis" (Latin for "sign of praise") after the inscription on the reverse of the medal.

== History and description ==
The Military Merit Medal was only awarded to officers and officials of similar rank. In the Austro-Hungarian order of precedence, the Military Merit Medal ranked below orders, such as the Order of the Iron Crown, and the Military Merit Cross. The Silver Military Merit Medal (established in 1911) outranked the Bronze Military Merit Medal. The one exception to the order of precedence was the Grand Military Merit Medal (Große Militär-Verdienstmedaille), a golden medal given as a sign of special recognition by the Emperor and usually awarded to senior officers. It outranked the lower grades of the Military Merit Cross and some orders.

The Military Merit Medal was awarded in peacetime for meritorious service and in wartime for outstanding acts (including bravery or military merit). The peacetime awards were on the statute ribbon, a red ribbon, while wartime awards were on the ribbon of the Bravery Medal, a "laddered" pattern of red stripes edged in white and with white between the "rungs". This latter was referred to as being either "on the War Ribbon" ("am Kriegsband") or "on the ribbon of the Bravery Medal" ("am Bande der Tapferkeitsmedaille"). Occasionally, the phrase "on the ribbon of the Military Merit Cross" ("am Bande des Militär-Verdienstkreuzes") was used, as the Military Merit Cross also used the ribbon of the Bravery Medal.

Awards on the War Ribbon took precedence over awards of the same class on the peacetime ribbon.

The Military Merit Medal originally came in one class, a gilt bronze version. Originally, repeat awards were not authorized (except that one could receive both the peacetime version and the version on the War Ribbon). On March 26, 1911, a Silver Military Merit Medal was founded. It was intended to reward those who would have earned a second award of the Military Merit Medal. It too could be awarded on either of the two ribbons. Originally, it was intended that the Silver Military Merit Medal would replace a Bronze Military Merit Medal, but on April 7, 1914, wearing of both at the same time was permitted.

On December 13, 1916, the addition of a pair of gilt crossed swords on the ribbon was authorized to recognize a higher grade of wartime merit. In addition, reflecting the increasing number of recommendations for repeat awards as World War I progressed, on April 1, 1916, the Emperor authorized one or two 8-mm wide silver clasps on the ribbon. Two such clasps would indicate a third award of the Silver Military Merit Medal. If swords were also earned, these were mounted on the clasp.

Also founded on April 1, 1916, was the Grand Military Merit Medal (Große Militär-Verdienstmedaille), also called the Grand Signum Laudis (Große Signum Laudis). This was intended for the "highest especially praiseworthy recognition" and was awarded only 30 times (with 4 repeat awards). 28 of its recipients were officers of general's rank; the other two were the naval aviator Gottfried von Banfield (1916) and the cryptologist Hermann Pokorny (1918). The Grand Military Merit Medal was of gilt bronze, and was 38-mm in diameter, compared to 32-mm for the Silver Military Merit Medal. The crown was surmounted by a wreath of laurel leaves. The repeat awards were indicated by a golden clasp on the ribbon, and all awards were on the War Ribbon. While the Bronze and Silver Military Merit Medals were essentially reserved for Austro-Hungarians only, ten of the 30 Grand Military Merit Medals were awarded to foreigners (9 German generals and 1 Ottoman general, Enver Pasha).

A new series of Silver and Bronze Military Merit Medals was created on April 18, 1917, which featured the bust of Emperor Karl I, who had acceded to the Austro-Hungarian throne after the death of Franz Joseph I on November 21, 1916. The main difference, besides the bust of the new Emperor in place of the old, was the replacement of the single crown above the medal by the paired crowns of Austria and Hungary on a bed of laurel and oak leaves. Also, given late-war conditions, the new medals were cruder in quality than their predecessors. A new Grand Military Merit Medal was added on April 28, 1917.

=== Description ===
Bronze, silver or gold medal with bust of the reigning emperor on the obverse and the words "SIGNUM LAUDIS" (Latin for "Sign of Praise") on the reverse, surrounded by a wreath, half-laurels and half-oak leaves. The Medal is surmounted by a crown (dual crowns for the Karl I type) and worn from a tri-fold ribbon.

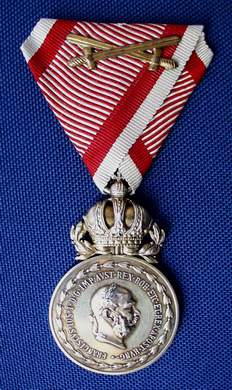
Grand Military Merit Medal with swords

== Post-World War I ==
The Military Merit Medal became obsolete with the fall of the Austro-Hungarian monarchy in November 1918. However, previously awarded medals continued to be worn by veterans in many of the successor states of the empire. After the Anschluss in 1938, when Nazi Germany annexed the Austrian Republic, the Military Merit Medal and other Austro-Hungarian medals were often worn mounted German-style rather than on trifolds. Equally, the 1934 German The Honour Cross of the World War 1914/1918 was extended to eligible Austrian and Czech military personnel after the Anschluss and the annexation of the Sudetenland in 1938, as well as to Germanic personnel from the Memelland following its annexation in 1939. It was also suspended from trifold-style ribbons in those countries.

=== Hungarian Signum Laudis ===
In Hungary, which was under the regency of Miklós Horthy, many imperial decorations were continued or revived in modified forms. One of these was the Signum Laudis, reestablished in 1922. The Hungarian Signum Laudis replaced the Austrian crown with the Hungarian Crown of Saint Stephen. The obverse featured the double cross of the Hungarian coat of arms and the reverse added the date 1922 below the words SIGNUM LAUDIS. New ribbons were also introduced: a green ribbon for civil awards and a green ribbon with narrow white (inner) and red (outer) stripes for military awards. A war ribbon was authorized in 1939 which reversed the colors of the military ribbon to red with narrow white (inner) and green (outer) stripes. Crossed swords were added for war decorations.

It came in 3 classes:

- Hungarian Grand Gold Military Merit Medal
- Hungarian Silver Military Merit Medal, civilian and military version, the latter came also with reversed trifold and swords after 1939 for war decoration.
- Hungarian Bronze Military Merit Medal, civilian and military version, the latter came also with reversed trifold and swords after 1939 for war decoration.

Hungarian Grand Gold Military Merit Medal from 1929	Hungarian Grand Gold Military Merit Medal small decoration after 1939 (Military award)	Hungarian Silver Military Merit Medal (Civilian award)	Hungarian Silver Military Merit Medal (Military award)	Hungarian Silver Military Merit Medal (Military award) with swords	Hungarian Bronze Military Merit Medal (Civilian award)	Hungarian Bronze Military Merit Medal (Military award)	Hungarian Bronze Military Merit Medal (Military award) with swords

== Notable recipients of the Signum Laudis ==
- Archduke Eugen of Austria – Austro-Hungarian field marshal
- Archduke Friedrich, Duke of Teschen – Austro-Hungarian field marshal in World War I
- Aladár Balog v. Mankobükk – Austro-Hungarian Rittmeister 11. Husaren-Regiment in World War I
- Eugen Beyer – Austro-Hungarian army officer, later a general in the Austrian and German armies
- Eduard von Böhm-Ermolli – Austro-Hungarian field marshal
- Svetozar Boroević – Austro-Hungarian field marshal
- Franz Graf Conrad von Hötzendorf – Austro-Hungarian Chief of the General Staff
- Engelbert Dollfuss – Austrian Chancellor and veteran of the Great War
- Hermann Kövess von Kövessháza – final commander-in-chief of the Austro-Hungarian Army
- Alexander Löhr – Austro-Hungarian army officer, later commander of the Austrian Air Force and then a general in the Luftwaffe.
- Artur Phleps – Austro-Hungarian army officer, later an Obergruppenführer in the Waffen-SS.
- Ludwig Wittgenstein – Austrian–British philosopher
- Miklós Horthy – Austro-Hungarian naval officer, later Regent of Hungary.
- Stefan Sarkotić – Croatian general in the Austro-Hungarian army.
- Gheorghe Flondor – ethnic Romanian captain in the Austro-Hungarian army.
- Mieczysław Smorawiński – Austro-Hungarian army officer, later a general in the Polish Army, murdered in the Katyn massacre of 1940.
- Józef Zając – officer in the Polish Legions in World War I and later Polish Army and Air Force general.
- Georg Ritter von Trapp – Austro-Hungarian naval officer whose family is immortalized in the musical The Sound of Music.
- Gottfried von Banfield - naval aviator (1916)
- Hermann Pokorny – cryptologist (1918).
- Hermann Senkowsky – Austro-Hungarian army officer, later finance minister of the General Government
- Tibor Farkas de Boldogfa – lawyer, politician, Hungarian parliament representative, Hussar captain.
- vitéz Sándor Farkas de Boldogfa – Hungarian colonel, local captain of the Order of Vitéz in the Zala County.

Foreign recipients:

- Erich Ludendorff – German general.
- Erich von Falkenhayn – German general.
- Paul von Hindenburg – German field marshal and later President of Germany.
- Mustafa Kemal Atatürk – Ottoman colonel in early period of World War I; later Mareşal, President and founder of the Republic of Turkey (2nd Class with War Decoration 1916)

In fiction:

- In The Good Soldier Švejk by Jaroslav Hašek, "Sergeant Teveles" possesses a silver Military Merit Medal.
- In the 1980 Czechoslovak war film Signum Laudis, "Corporal Hoferik" was awarded a Military Merit Medal.
- In the 1956 Hungarian film Hannibál tanár úr, the main character Béla Nyúl was told he would deserve a medal for his paper written about Hannibal, "Maybe a Signum Laudis".

== See also ==
- Military Merit Cross (Austria-Hungary)
- Medal for Bravery (Austria-Hungary)
