= Archduchess Margaret of Austria (born 1925) =

Austrian archduchess (1925–1979)

Archduchess Margaret
- Princess of Monteleone
- Born: 17 August 1925; Budapest, Kingdom of Hungary
- Died: 3 May 1979 (aged 53); Stockholm, Sweden
- Spouse: Alexander Czech, Prince of Monteleone (m. 1943)
- Issue: Sibylla Erba-Odescalchi, Principesa di Monteleone
- House: Habsburg-Lorraine
- Father: Archduke Joseph Francis of Austria
- Mother: Anna of Saxony

Archduchess Margaret of Austria (17 August 1925 – 3 May 1979), was an Austrian archduchess of the House of Habsburg-Lorraine. She was the daughter of Archduke Joseph Francis of Austria and Anna of Saxony. She married an Italian nobleman, Alexander Czech, Prince of Monteleone, and had issue.

== Biography ==
=== Family ===
Archduchess Margaret was born on 17 August 1925 in Budapest, Hungary. She was the eldest child of Archduke Joseph Francis of Austria and his wife, Princess Anna of Saxony. Through her mother, Margaret was a granddaughter of Frederick Augustus III, the last King of Saxony. Her father was from a branch of the House of Habsburg-Lorraine who reigned as Palatines of Hungary on behalf of the king.

She was also often referenced by her nickname, "Margit."

=== Marriage ===
On her eighteenth birthday, Margaret married Alexander Czech, son of General Jószef Czech and Princess Amalia Erba Odescalchi dei Principi di Monteleone. He had been made Prince of Monteleone by King Victor Emmanuel III of Italy shortly before his marriage. The couple had a daughter named Sibylla, who later succeeded her father as Principessa di Monteleone.

The couple lived in Budapest, where Alexander was a landowner and worked as lawyer. In this capacity, he aided Jews during World War II, for which he would receive the Righteous Among the Nations award in 1999. However in 1945, the threat posed by the Soviet Red Army forced the couple to flee to Sweden with the assistance of Crown Prince Gustaf Adolf. Archduchess Margaret died there on 3 May 1979 at the age of 53.

== Ancestry ==
Ancestors of Archduchess Margaret of Austria (born 1925)

8. Archduke Joseph Karl, Palatine of Hungary
4. Archduke Joseph August, Palatine of Hungary
9. Princess Clotilde of Saxe-Coburg and Gotha
2. Archduke Joseph Francis of Austria
10. Prince Leopold of Bavaria
5. Princess Auguste of Bavaria
11. Archduchess Gisela of Austria
1. Archduchess Margaret of Austria
12. George, King of Saxony
6. King Frederick Augustus III of Saxony
13. Infanta Maria Ana of Portugal
3. Princess Anna of Saxony
14. Ferdinand IV, Grand Duke of Tuscany
7. Archduchess Louise of Austria
15. Princess Alice of Bourbon-Parma

== Bibliography ==
- Gullman, Sven H. ""Righteous among the people" - Jewish award to a Catholic prince in Stockholm". Arv och Minne. Archived from the original on 2014-07-25.
- Énache, Nicolas (1999). La descendance de Marie-Thérèse de Habsburg (Éditions L'intermédiaire des chercheurs et curieux ed.). Paris. ISBN 978-2-908003-04-8..
- Parisot, Jacques; Parisot, Nelly (1984). La descendance de François-Joseph Ier empereur d'Autriche (Éditions Christian ed.). Besançon. ISBN 978-2-86496-014-0..
