= Princess Auguste of Bavaria (1875–1964) =

- Archduchess of Austria, Princess Royal of Hungary and Bohemia
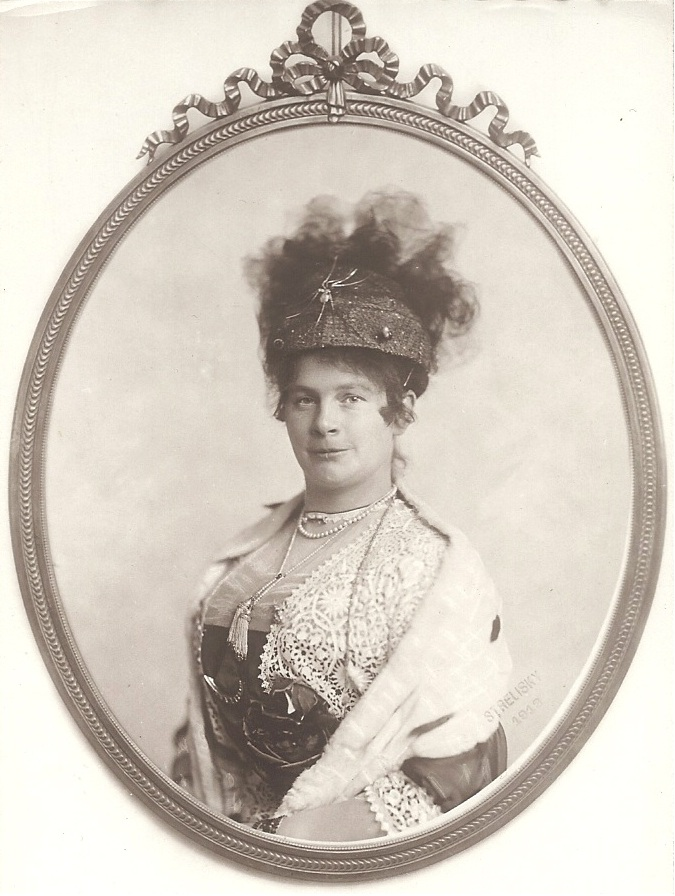
- Portrait by Sándor Strelisky, 1910
- Born: 28 April 1875; München, Bavaria, German Empire
- Died: 25 June 1964 (aged 89); Regensburg, Bavaria, West Germany
- Spouse: Archduke Joseph August of Austria (m. 1893; died 1962)
- Issue: Archduke Joseph Francis; Archduchess Gisela; Archduchess Sophie; Archduke Laszlo; Archduke Matyas; Archduchess Magdalena
Names
- Auguste Maria Luise
- House: Wittelsbach
- Father: Prince Leopold of Bavaria
- Mother: Archduchess Gisela of Austria

Princess Auguste of Bavaria (German: Auguste Maria Luise Prinzessin von Bayern; 28 April 1875 – 25 June 1964) was a member of the Bavarian Royal House of Wittelsbach and the wife of Archduke Joseph August of Austria.

== Birth and family ==
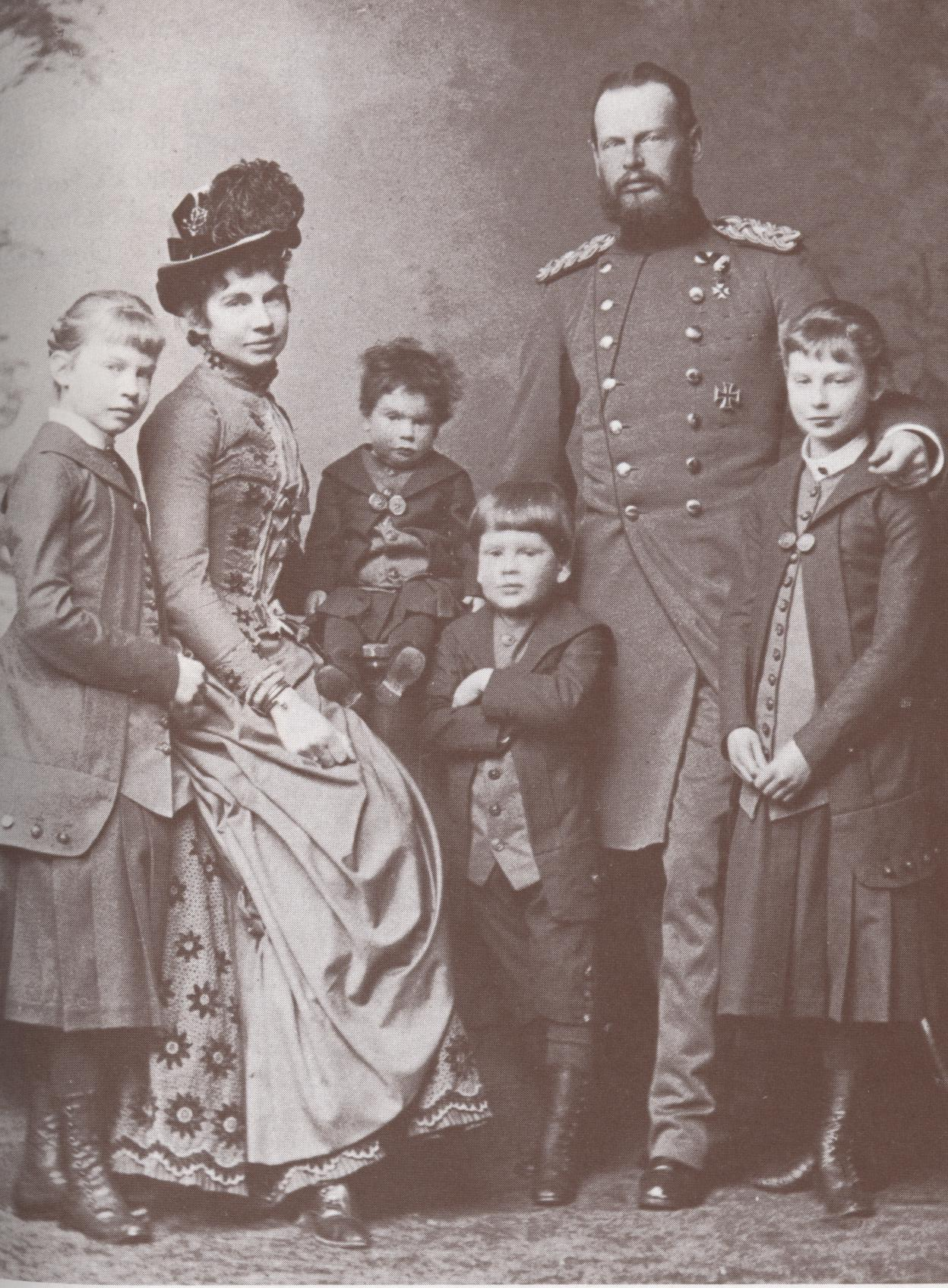
Prince Leopold of Bavaria and Archduchess Gisela of Austria with their children, c. 1885.

Princess Auguste was born in Munich, Bavaria, the second child of Prince Leopold of Bavaria and his wife, Archduchess Gisela of Austria. Her paternal grandparents were Luitpold, Prince Regent of Bavaria, the de facto ruler of Bavaria from 1886 to 1912, and Archduchess Auguste Ferdinande of Austria. Her maternal grandparents were Austrian Emperor Franz Joseph I and Empress Elisabeth of Austria. She had one older sister, Princess Elisabeth Marie of Bavaria and two younger brothers, Prince Georg of Bavaria and Prince Konrad of Bavaria.

== Marriage ==
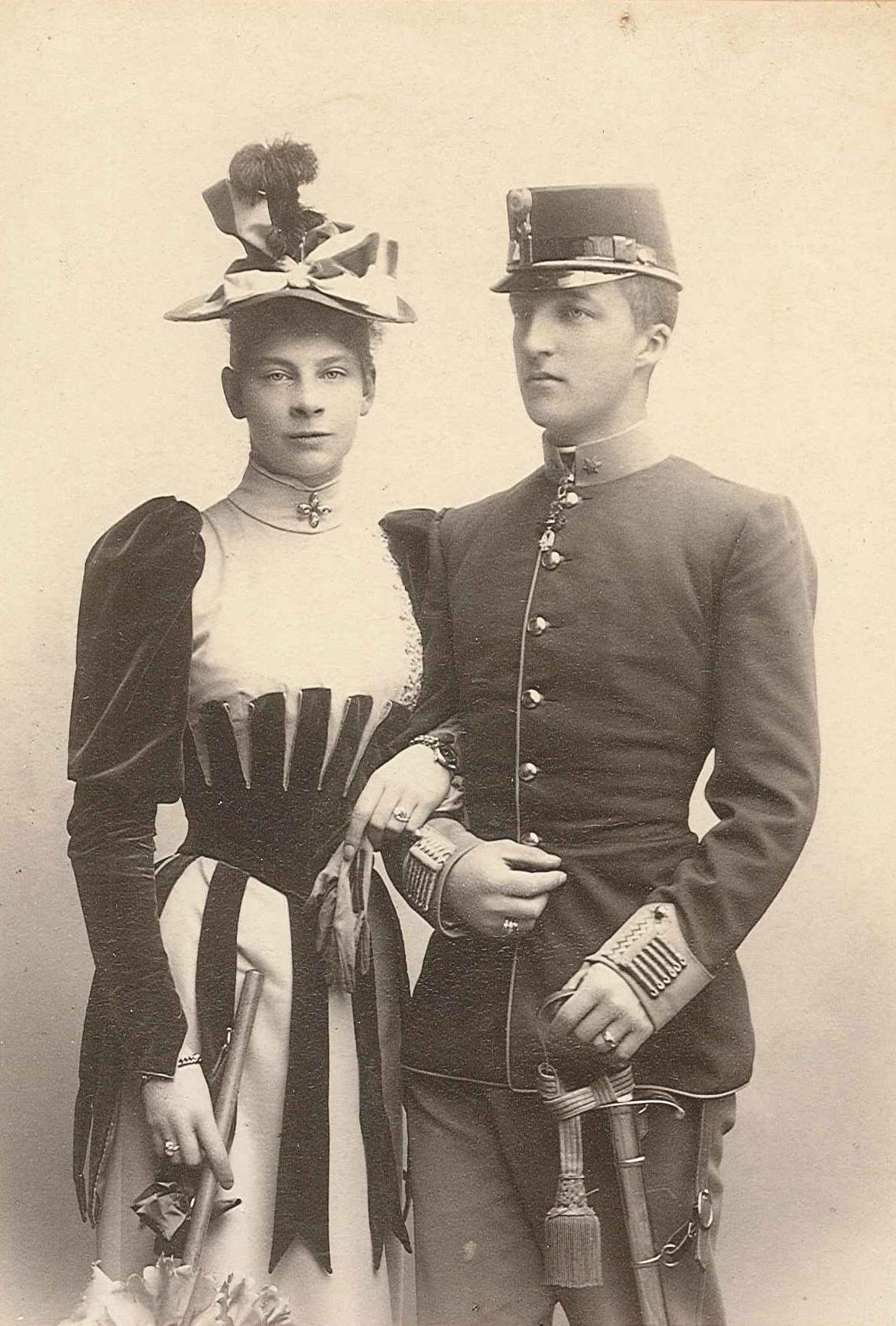
Archdurchess Auguste and her husband Archduke Joseph August.

She married Joseph August, Archduke of Austria, on 15 November 1893 in Munich. Archduke Joseph August was a prominent member of the imperial family of Austria-Hungary who belonged to the socalled Hungarian or Palatinal branch of the House of Habsburg-Lorraine. The couple had six children.

== World War I ==
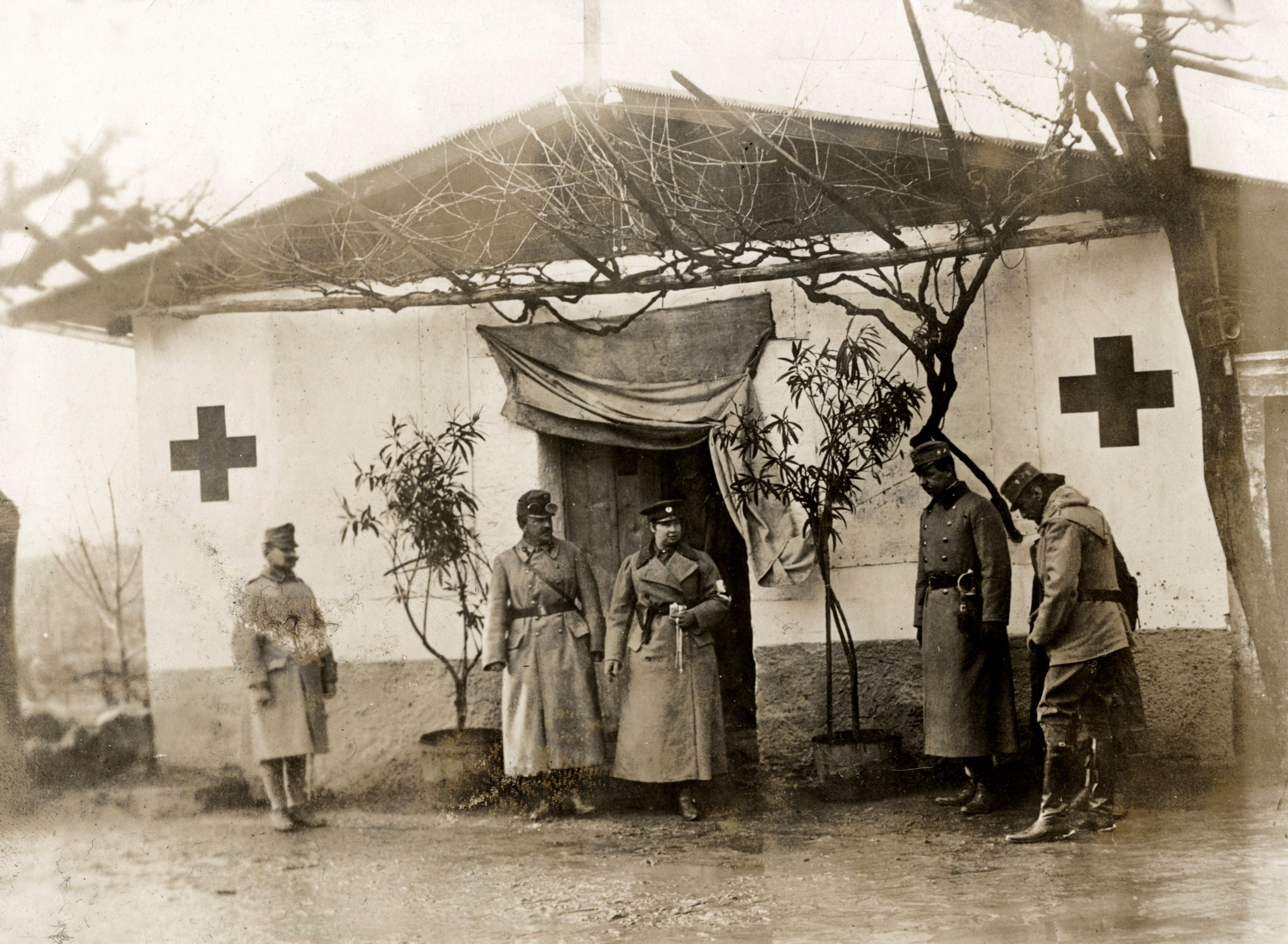
Joseph August and Auguste during a visit to a Red Cross field hospital in Northern Italy in 1916.

On the outbreak of war with Italy in 1915, Augusta Maria Louise, though in her 40s and the mother of a son serving as an officer, went to the front with the cavalry regiment of which her husband, the Archduke Josef August, a corps commander, was honorary colonel, and served a common soldier, wearing a saber and riding astride, until the end of the war.

== Later life ==
In the chaotic years after World War I and the collapse of Austria-Hungary, her husband briefly served as the head of state of Hungary in August 1919. Auguste and her husband remained in Budapest, where they moved in the highest social circles, until 1944, when they fled the advancing Red Army. After a brief stay in the United States, her sister-in-law, Margarethe Klementine of Thurn and Taxis, hosted her in Regensburg, West Germany, where she died in 1964.

Auguste and her husband, who died in 1962, were buried in the cemetery of Feldafing, on Starnberg Lake. After the fall of communism in Hungary, the couple, along with other Hungarian Habsburgs who were buried in Feldafing were exhumed and reburied in the Palatinal Crypt in the Royal Castle of Buda.

== Gallery ==
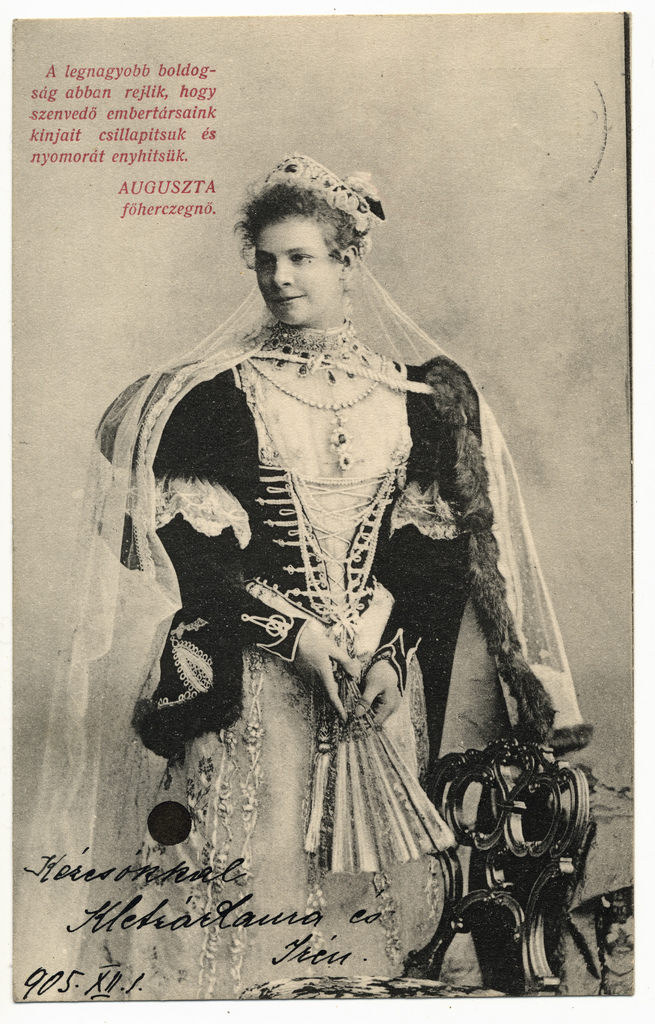
Photo by Sándor Strelisky, Budapest, 1910

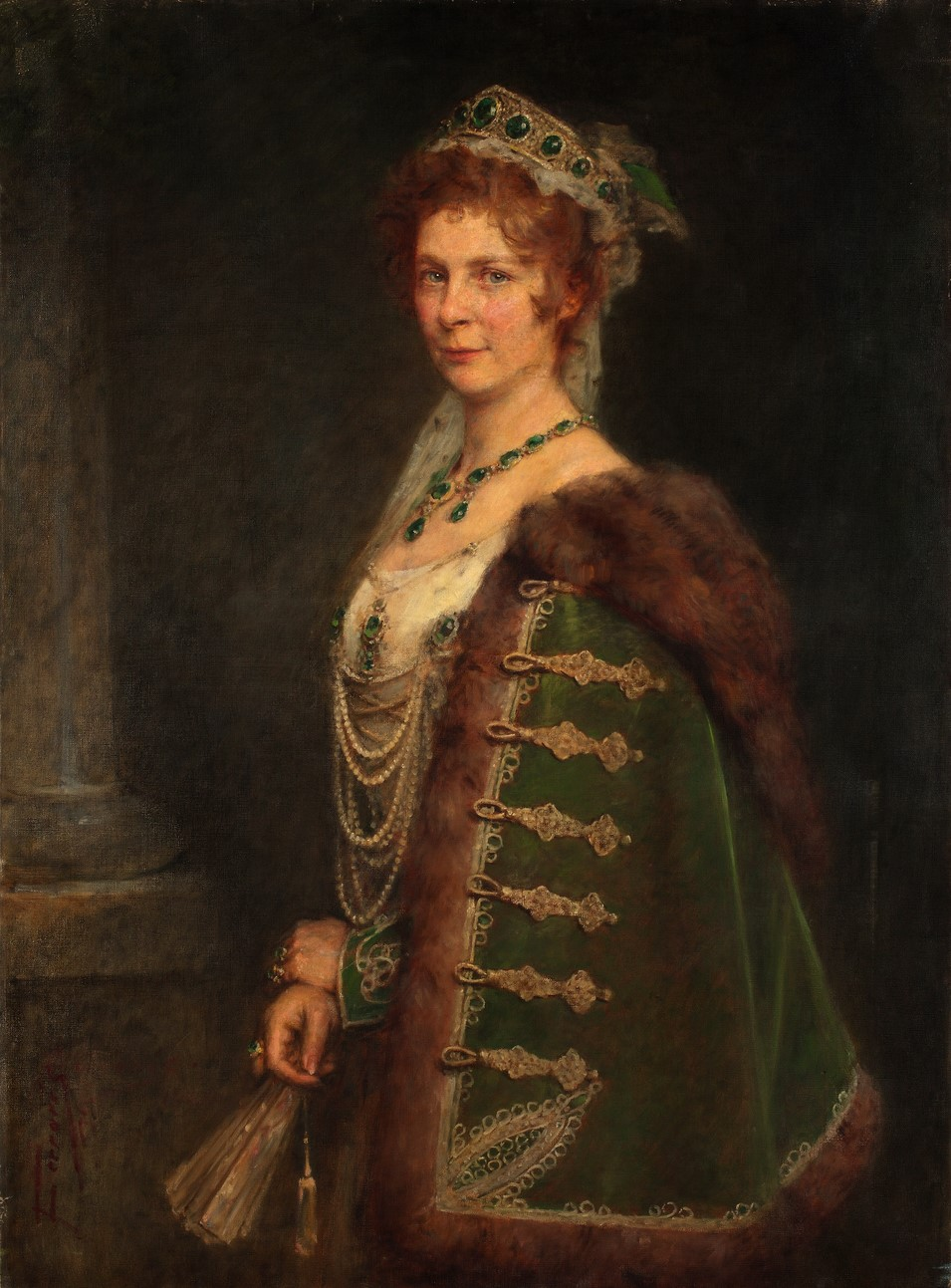
Portrait painting by Arthur von Ferraris, 1910

== Ancestry ==
Ancestors of Princess Auguste of Bavaria (1875–1964)

8. Ludwig I of Bavaria
4. Luitpold, Prince Regent of Bavaria
9. Princess Therese of Saxe-Hildburghausen
2. Prince Leopold of Bavaria
10. Leopold II, Grand Duke of Tuscany
5. Archduchess Auguste Ferdinande of Austria
11. Princess Maria Anna of Saxony
1. Princess Auguste of Bavaria
12. Archduke Franz Karl of Austria
6. Franz Joseph I of Austria
13. Princess Sophie of Bavaria
3. Archduchess Gisela of Austria
14. Duke Maximilian Joseph in Bavaria
7. Duchess Elisabeth in Bavaria
15. Princess Ludovika of Bavaria

== Issue ==
- Archduke Joseph Francis of Austria, born on 28 March 1895; died on 25 September 1957 (aged 62)
- Archduchess Gisela Auguste Anna Maria, born on 5 July 1897; died on 30 March 1901 (aged 3)
- Archduchess Sophie Klementine Elisabeth Klothilde Maria, born on 11 March 1899; died on 19 April 1978 (aged 79)
- Archduke Ladislaus Luitpold, born on 3 January 1901; died on 29 August 1946 (aged 44)
- Archduke Matthias Joseph Albrecht Anton Ignatius, born on 26 June 1904; died on 7 October 1905 (aged 1)
- Archduchess Magdalena Maria Raineria, born on 6 September 1909; died on 11 May 2000 (aged 90)

== Bibliography ==
- Adalbert, Prinz von Bayern (1979). Die Wittelsbacher. Geschichte unserer Familie (in German). Munich: Prestel Verlag.
