= Margaret of Austria =

Margaret of Austria may refer to:

- Margaret of Austria, Queen of Bohemia (c.1204–1266), titularly reigning Duchess of Austria & Styria, Queen consort of the Romans, Queen consort of Bohemia; married Henry II of Sicily and Ottokar II of Bohemia
- Margaret of Austria, Margravine of Moravia (c.1346 – 14. January 1366), married John Henry of Moravia
- Margarete of Austria (1395–1447), wife of Henry XVI, Duke of Bavaria
- Margaret of Austria, Electress of Saxony (1416–1486), Habsburg princess, daughter of duke Ernest of Austria, married elector Frederick II of Saxony
- Margaret of Austria, Duchess of Savoy (1480–1530), Governor of the Habsburg Netherlands, daughter of Maximilian I, Holy Roman Emperor and Mary of Burgundy, married John, Prince of Asturias and Philibert II, Duke of Savoy
- Margaret of Parma (1522–1586), Governor of the Habsburg Netherlands, daughter of Emperor Charles V, married Alessandro de' Medici & Ottavio Farnese
- Archduchess Margaret of Austria (nun), daughter of Ferdinand I, Holy Roman Emperor and his wife Anne of Bohemia and Hungary
- Archduchess Margaret of Austria (1567–1633), a member of the House of Habsburg
- Margaret of Austria, Queen of Spain (1584–1611), Queen of Spain, Portugal, Naples and Sicily, grandchild of emperor Ferdinand I, Holy Roman Emperor, married Philip III of Spain
- Archduchess Margarete Sophie of Austria (1870–1902), a member of the House of Habsburg
- Archduchess Margarethe Klementine of Austria (1870–1955), Princess of Thurn and Taxis, married Albert, 8th Prince of Thurn and Taxis
- Archduchess Margaret of Austria (1925-1979), member of the House of Habsburg-Lorraine
