= Géza of Hungary =

Géza of Hungary may refer to:

- Géza, Grand Prince of the Hungarians
- Géza I of Hungary, King of Hungary
- Géza II of Hungary, King of Hungary
- Géza, son of Géza II of Hungary, Hungarian royal prince
- Archduke Géza of Austria, Prince Royal of Hungary
