= Arthur von Ferraris =

Hungarian artist

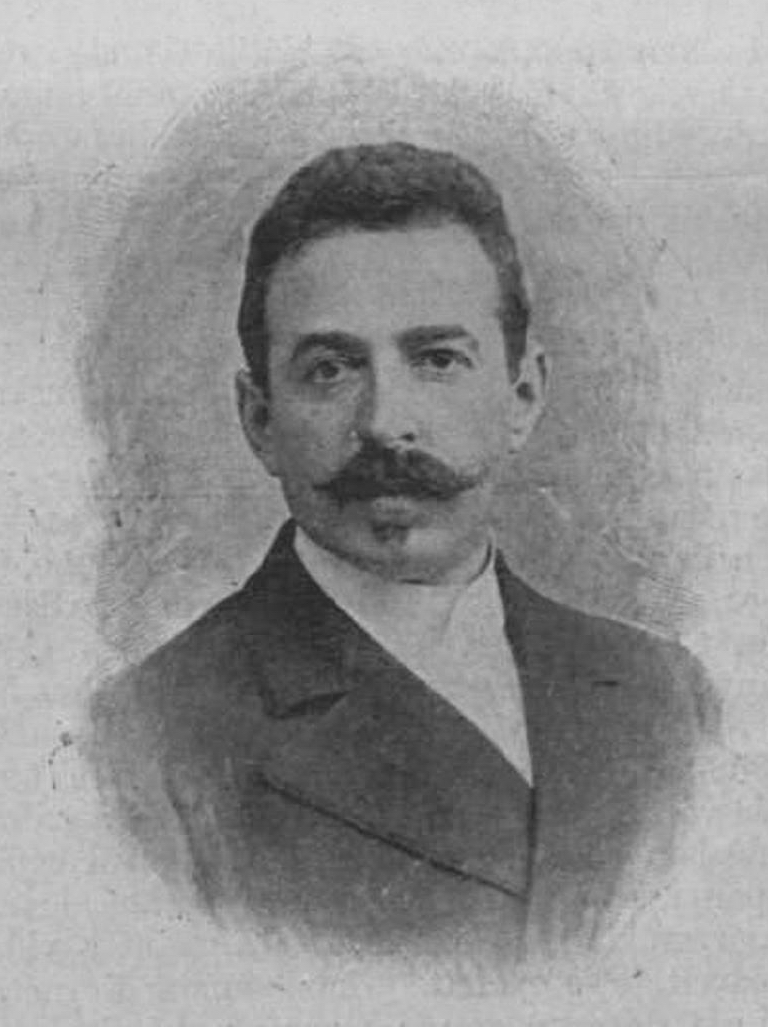
Photograph, 1898

Arthur von Ferraris (or di Ferraris; 1856–1936) was a Hungarian-born artist known for his portraits of society figures of his day and for his "orientalist" paintings.

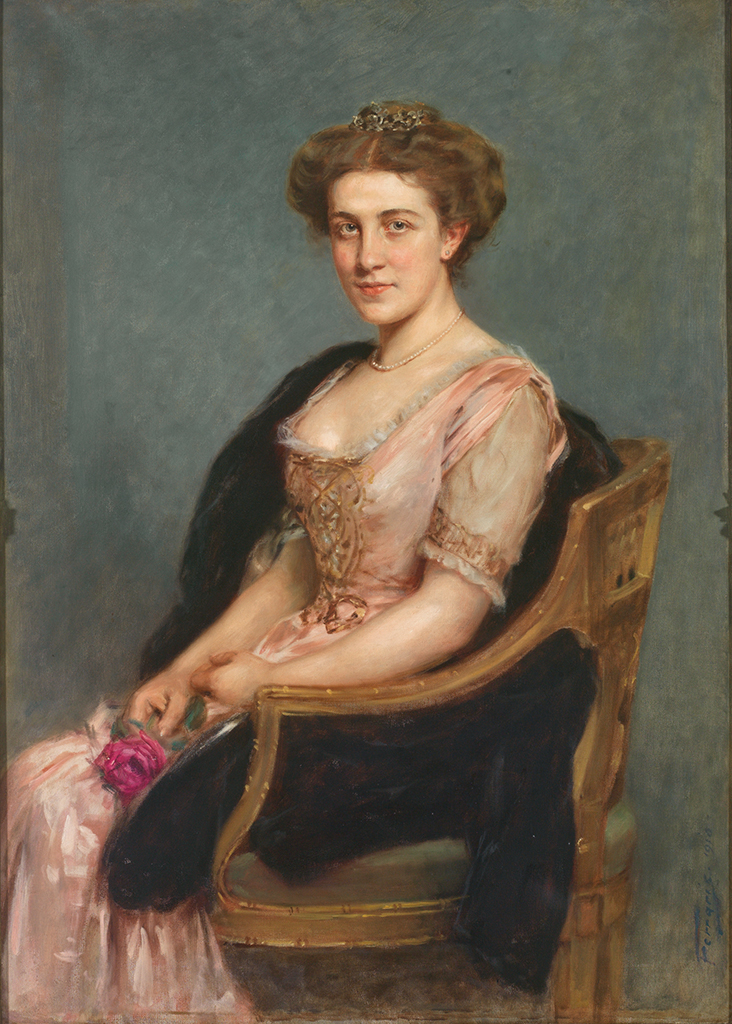
Arthur von Ferraris Portrait einer Dame 1910

Von Ferraris was born in Galkovitz, Hungary but moved to Vienna as a teenager to study with Joseph Matthaus Aigner. In 1876, at twenty, he moved to Paris to study with Jules Lefebvre. Von Ferraris spent time in Egypt and painted street scenes and market scenes that captured the imagination of the art world when he returned to Paris. In the late 1880s he shared a studio with Charles Wilda, a painter also known for his "orientalist" themes. His works from many countries made him known as a "citizen of the world."

Von Ferraris had "considerable success" as a society portrait painter. He exhibited these and his Orientalist works at the Salon des Artistes Francais in the 1880s and 1890s. One notable portrait von Ferraris painted was John Davison Rockefeller, in 1903. He also painted portraits of Edward M. Shepard, Johannes Schober, Felix M. Warburg, and other notables.

One of his most famous paintings is of the mythological story "Leda and the Swan."

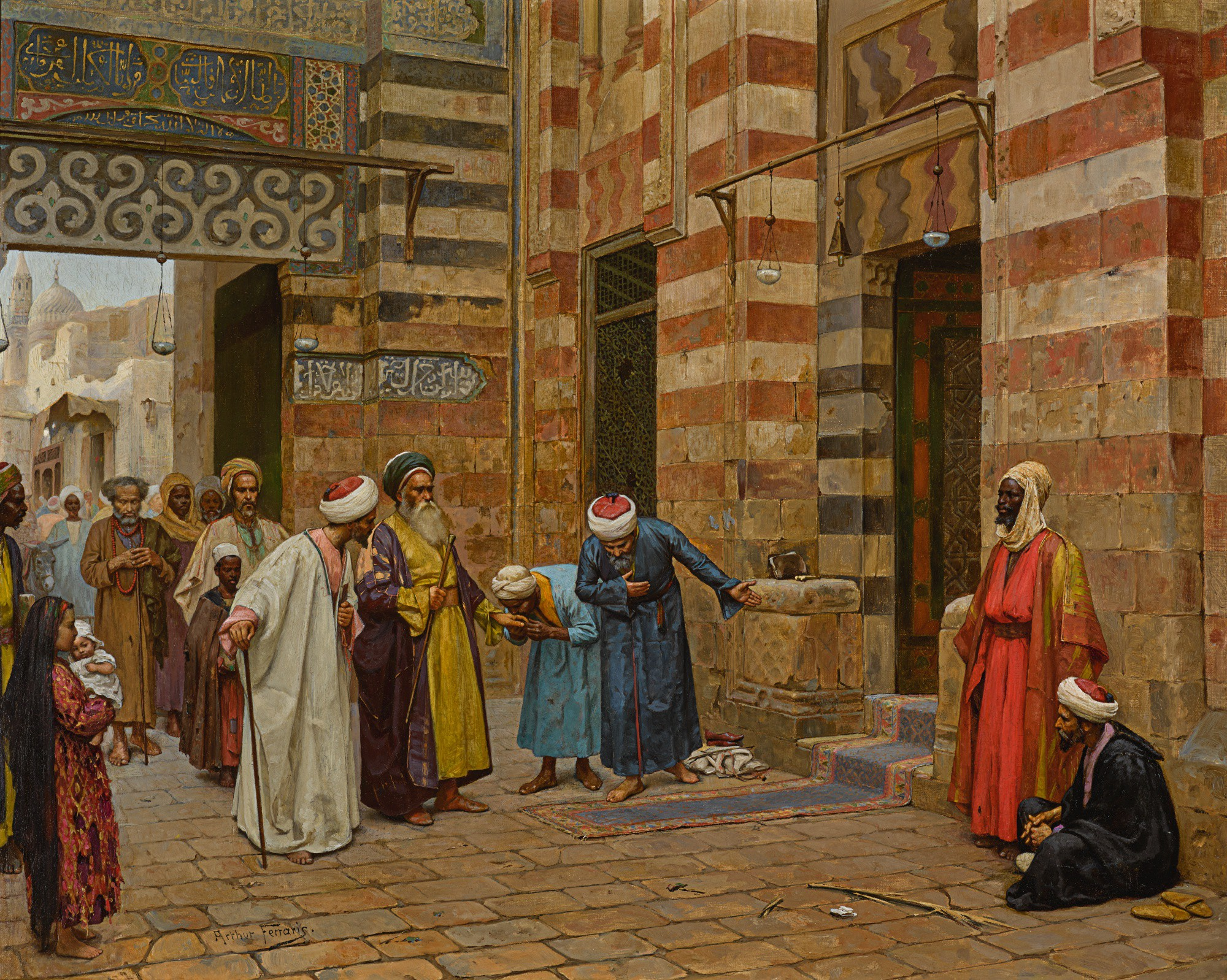
Arriving at the Mosque at Cairo

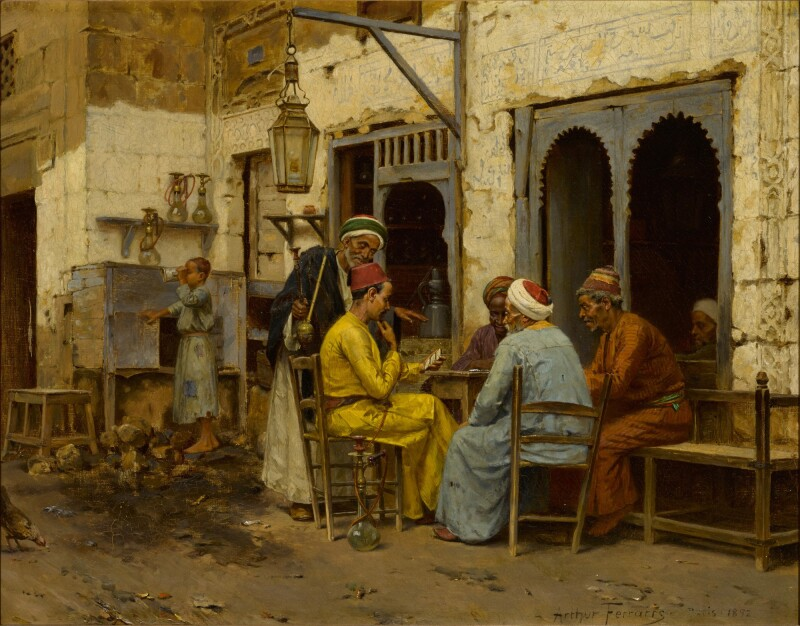
The Domino Players

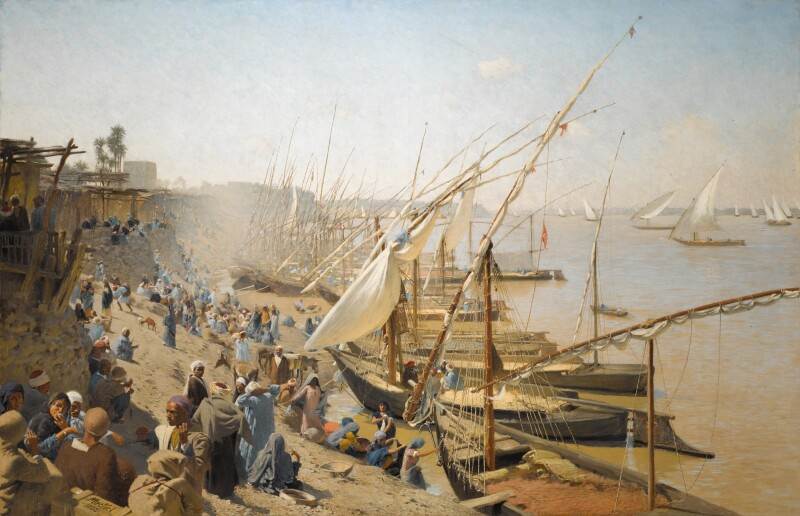
The Nile at Bulak

Von Ferraris's grandson is the designer Tom Karen.
