= Eduard Habsburg-Lothringen =

German-born Hungarian diplomat (born 1967)

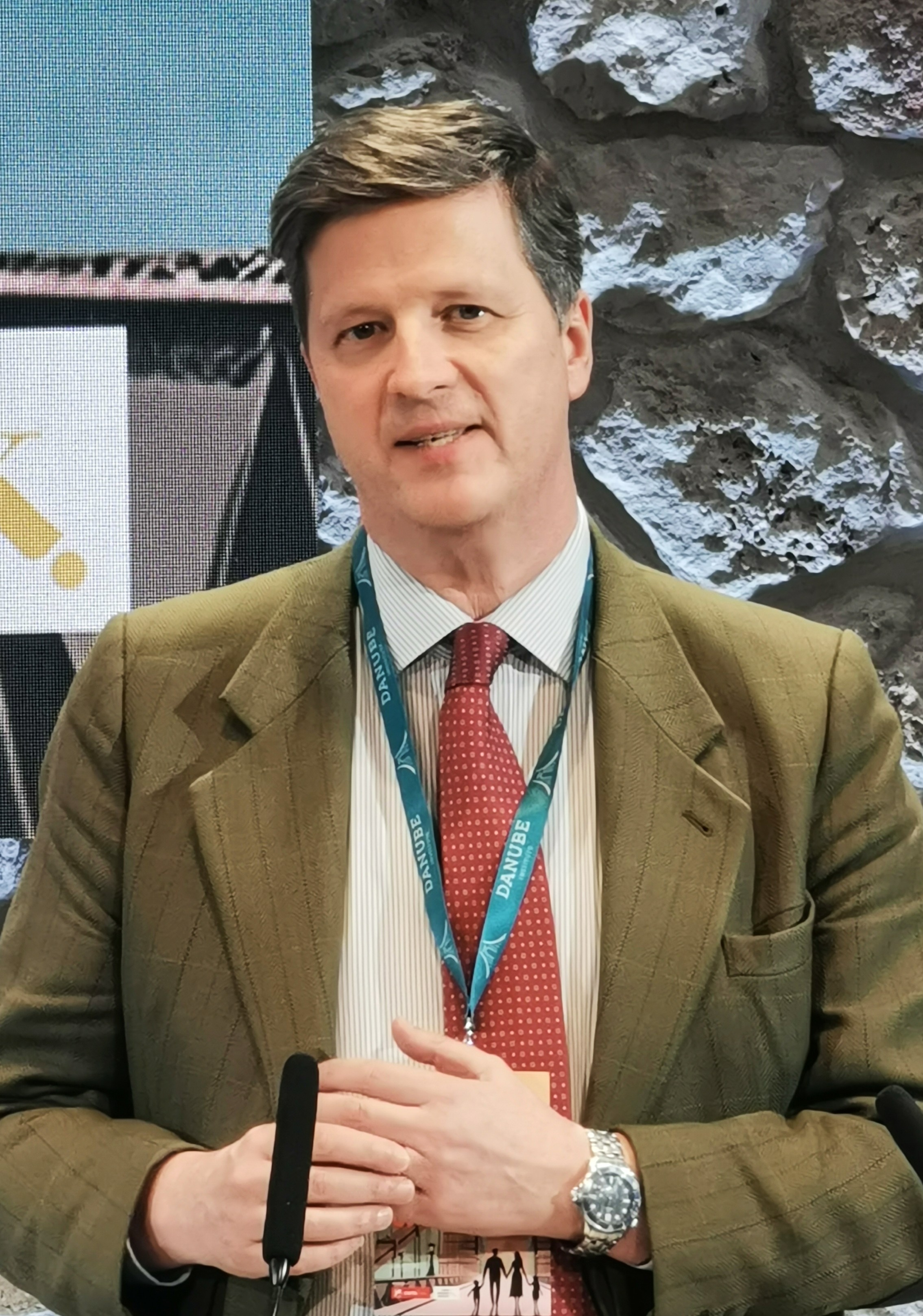
- Eduard Habsburg in 2025

Hungarian Ambassador to the Holy See
- In office 5 December 2015 – 30 November 2025
- President: János Áder (2015–2022); Katalin Novák (2022–2024); Tamás Sulyok (2024–2025)
- Prime Minister: Viktor Orbán
- Preceded by: Gabor Győriványi
- Succeeded by: Péter Kveck

Personal details
- Born: 12 January 1967 (age 59) Munich, Bavaria, West Germany
- Spouse: Maria Theresia von Gudenus (m. 1995)
- House: Habsburg-Lorraine
- Father: Archduke Michael of Austria
- Mother: Princess Christiana of Löwenstein-Wertheim-Rosenberg

Eduard Karl Joseph Michael Marcus Antonius Koloman Volkhold Maria Habsburg-Lothringen (Hungarian: Habsburg-Lotharingiai Eduárd Károly József Mihály Márk Antal Kálmán Folkold Mária; born 12 January 1967) is a Hungarian diplomat who served as Hungary's ambassador to the Holy See from 2015 to 2025. He is a member of the House of Habsburg-Lorraine, the former ruling family of Austria-Hungary.

== Early life ==
Habsburg is the son of Archduke Michael of Austria (b. 1942), son of Archduke Joseph Francis of Austria and Princess Anna of Saxony, and Princess Christiana of Löwenstein-Wertheim-Rosenberg (1940), daughter of Karl, 8th Prince of Löwenstein-Wertheim-Rosenberg. He is legally known in Austria as Eduard Habsburg-Lothringen and is referred to by the traditional title of Archduke Eduard of Austria in the Almanach de Gotha. He acquired Hungarian citizenship as his father was born in Hungary. Eduard is the great-great-great-grandson of Emperor Franz Joseph I. He spent much of his upbringing in Munich, Germany, Venice, Italy, and Austria.

== Education ==
Habsburg studied philosophy and history at the Catholic University of Eichstätt-Ingolstadt, where he earned a doctorate in philosophy in 1999 with a dissertation on the end of Neo-Thomism, graduating magna cum laude. He later pursued further studies at the University of Fribourg in Switzerland.

== Business career ==
After university, he worked for a children's television company in Germany and produced animated series Nick & Perry. He was a zombie-movie screenwriter, cartoon producer, love-triangle novelist and media personality.

== Diplomatic career ==
In December 2015, Habsburg was appointed to serve as Hungary's ambassador to the Holy See and Sovereign Military Order of Malta.

He concluded his mission to the Holy See in November 2025.

== Personal life ==
On 1 July 1995 he married Maria Theresia von Gudenus (b. 1967), a descendant of Archduke Johann of Austria. They have six children, one son and five daughters.

Habsburg is a practising Catholic. He has expressed an admiration for Thomas More, Pope Gregory I, József Mindszenty, Thérèse of Lisieux, Charles I of Austria, and his patron saint and namesake Edward the Confessor.

== Publications ==
=== Articles ===
- "The 21st-century Habsburg mission". Catholic Herald. 17 November 2016.
- "They Did Nothing But Pray". First Things. 27 June 2019.
- "My family history in full – well, almost". Catholic Herald. 6 August 2020.

=== Books ===
- James Bond in 60 Minuten: Staunen im Stundentakt – Die Welt in 60 Minuten. 2008.
- Die Reise mit Nella. 2008.
- Wo Grafen schlafen: Was ist wo im Schloss und warum?. 2011.
- Marcus Schwier: Intérieurs. 2012.
- Lena in Waldersbach. 2013.
- Dubbie: The Double-Headed Eagle. Full Quiver Publishing. 2020. ISBN 978-1987970203.
- The Habsburg Way. 7 Rules for Turbulent Times. Sophia Institute Press. 2023. ISBN 978-1644138106.
- Building A Wholesome Family in a Broken World: Habsburg Lessons from the Centuries. Sophia Institute Press. 2024. ISBN 979-8889112563.
- Discovering the Latin Mass: A Travel Guide for the Curious. Sophia Institute Press. 2026. ISBN 979-8889117032.
