= Archduke Joseph August of Austria =

Archduke of Austria

Archduke Joseph August
- Imperial Prince & Archduke of Austria, Royal Prince of Hungary and Bohemia etc. etc.
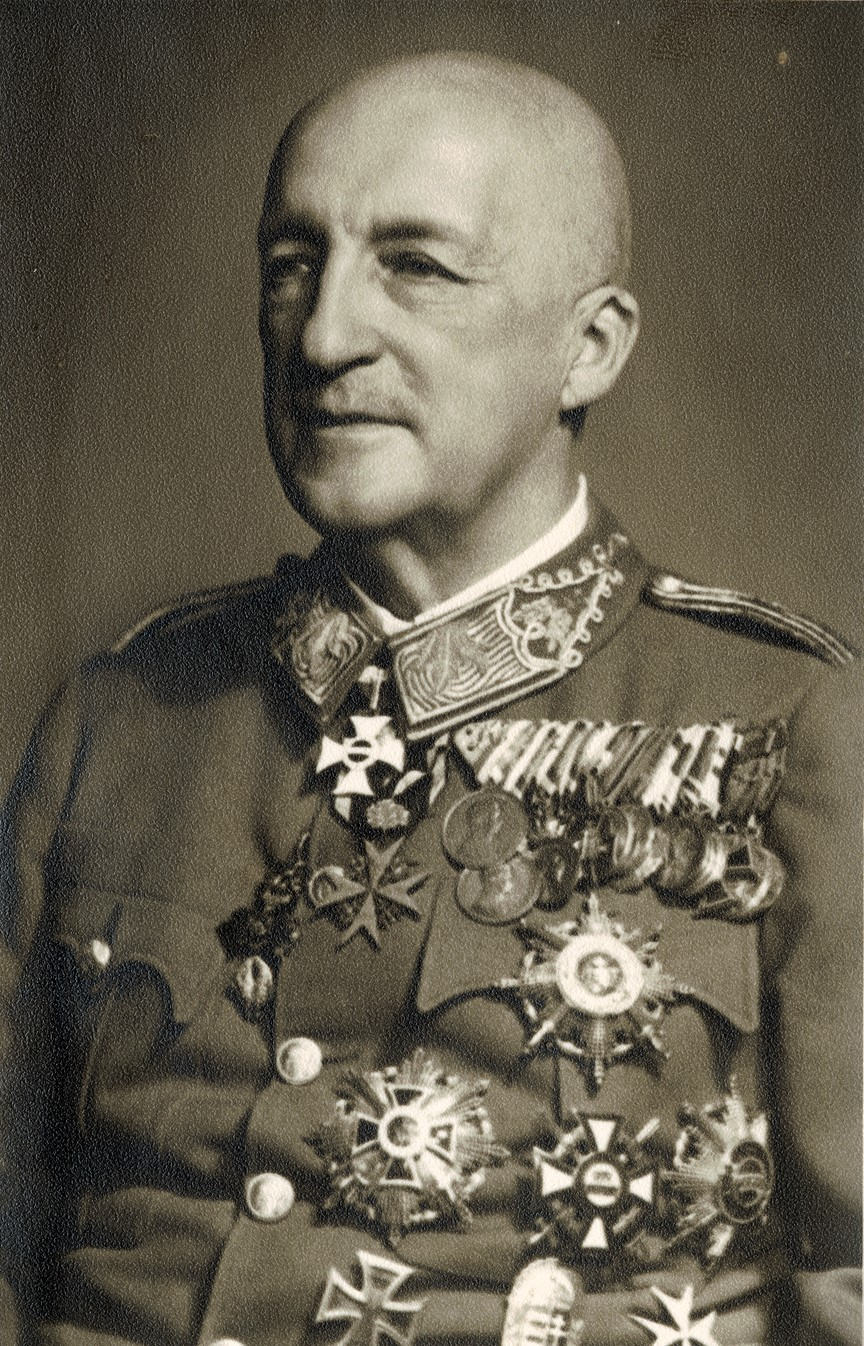
- Archduke August as Field marshal of the Royal Hungarian Army in 1943

Governor of the First Hungarian Republic
- In office 6 August 1919 – 23 August 1919
- Monarch: Vacant
- Prime Minister: István Friedrich
- Predecessor: Gyula Peidl (as acting head of state)
- Successor: István Friedrich (as acting head of state)

Homo Regius of the Kingdom of Hungary
- In office 26 October 1918 – 16 November 1918
- Monarch: Charles IV
- Prime Minister: Sándor Wekerle; János Hadik; Mihály Károlyi
- Born: 9 August 1872; Alcsút, Kingdom of Hungary, Austria-Hungary
- Died: 6 July 1962 (aged 89); Rain, Bavaria, West Germany
- Spouse: Princess Auguste of Bavaria (m. 1893)
- Issue Detail: Archduke Joseph Francis; Archduchess Gisela Auguste; Archduchess Sophie Klementine; Archduke Ladislaus Luitpold; Archduke Matthias Joseph; Archduchess Magdalena Maria
Names
- German: Joseph August Viktor Klemens Maria von Habsburg-Lothringen; Hungarian: Habsburg–Lotaringiai József Ágost Viktor Kelemen Mária
- House: Habsburg-Lorraine
- Father: Archduke Joseph Karl, Palatine of Hungary
- Mother: Princess Clotilde of Saxe-Coburg and Gotha
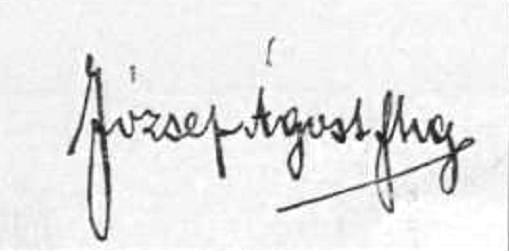
- Signature

Archduke Joseph August Viktor Klemens Maria of Austria, Prince of Hungary and Bohemia (9 August 1872 – 6 July 1962) was a prominent member of the House of Habsburg-Lorraine, who was a Feldmarschall (field marshal) of the Austro-Hungarian Army, and briefly the head of state of Hungary after World War I.

== Early life ==
Archduke Joseph August was born on 9 August 1872 at Alcsút in the Kingdom of Hungary. Born into the Hungarian or Palatinal branch of the House of Habsburg-Lorraine, he was the eldest son of Archduke Joseph Karl of Austria (1833–1905) and his wife Princess Clotilde of Saxe-Coburg and Gotha (1846–1927). Joseph August's grandfather, Archduke Joseph of Austria (1776–1847), a younger son of Leopold II, Holy Roman Emperor, had been Palatine and Viceroy of Hungary.

== Marriage ==
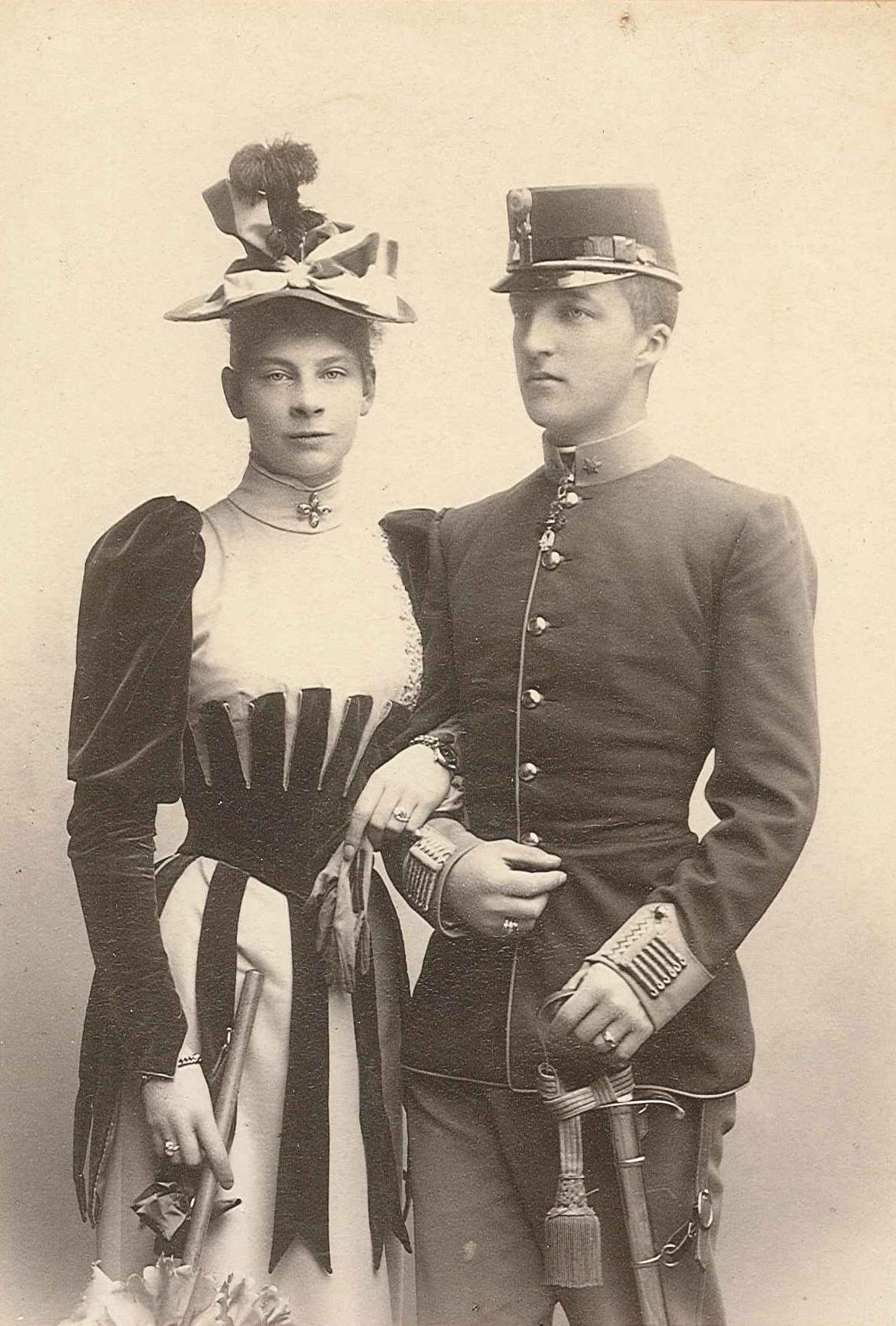
Archduke Joseph August and his wife Archdurchess Auguste

On 15 November 1893, in Munich, he married Princess Auguste Maria of Bavaria (1877–1964), daughter of Prince Leopold of Bavaria (1846–1930) and his wife Archduchess Gisela of Austria (1856–1932).

Archduke Joseph August became thus from 1893 grandson-in-law to Austrian Emperor Francis Joseph I. His wife's mother, Archduchess Gisela, was the eldest surviving daughter of Francis Joseph and Empress Elisabeth ("Sisi"). The young couple's children were born in their great-grandfather's lifetime.

They had six children:

- Archduke Joseph Francis of Austria, born on 28 March 1895; died on 25 September 1957 (aged 62)
- Archduchess Gisela Auguste Anna Maria, born on 5 July 1897; died on 30 March 1901 (aged 3)
- Archduchess Sophie Klementine Elisabeth Klothilde Maria, born on 11 March 1899; died on 19 April 1978 (aged 79)
- Archduke Ladislaus Luitpold, born on 3 January 1901; died on 29 August 1946 (aged 45)
- Archduke Matthias Joseph Albrecht Anton Ignatius, born on 26 June 1904; died on 7 October 1905 (aged 1)
- Archduchess Magdalena Maria Raineria, born on 6 September 1909; died on 11 May 2000 (aged 90)

== Military career ==
Joseph August began his military career in 1890 when he was commissioned into the 1st Infantry Regiment as a Leutnant. He was soon promoted to Oberleutnant and was transferred to 72nd Infantry Regiment in 1893. He was transferred to Dragoon Regiment #6 in 1894 and then transferred to the 1st Royal Hungarian Honvéd Hussars by the emperor and promoted to the rank of Major. He took command of this regiment in 1904 and then went on to command 79th Honvéd infantry brigade in 1908 then finally the 31st infantry division at Budapest in 1911.

== World War I ==
In 1914, he was involved in combat in the Galician theatre and took command of the VII Corps and was involved in fighting in the Carpathian Mountains for which he was awarded, among others, the Austrian Order of Leopold and the Prussian Iron Cross. After Italy became involved in the war, he was transferred to the Carinthian border and involved in fighting the Isonzo army. August remained on the front until the Ninth Battle of the Isonzo in 1916, a period in which once again he was highly decorated. Joseph August was highly popular among his troops, especially those of Hungarian nationality.

In November 1916, Joseph August was put in command of the Heeresfront fighting against Russian and Romanian forces, and in 1917, he was awarded the Military Order of Maria Theresa and the Pour le Mérite. In January 1918 he was put in command of the 6th Army in the Southern theatre and that July took over the South Tyrolean Army Group, which was the 10th and the 11th Armies. Finally, on 26 October 1918, he was sent to the Balkans theatre to take command of the Heeresgruppe Kövess, which had lost Serbia, Albania and Montenegro. He was the last person to be appointed a Feldmarschall (Field Marshal) of the Austro-Hungarian Army, on 24 October 1918 as an attempt by his cousin, Emperor Charles I, to placate Hungarian nationalists.

== Regent of Hungary ==
On 27 October 1918, Emperor Charles made August the "Homo Regius" of Hungary, but August asked to be released from his oath of allegiance to the emperor. He then began negotiations and appointed Count János Hadik to build a new national government. However, the Aster Revolution broke out on 31 October 1918, deterring his plans. In November, the socialist Hungarian Democratic Republic was proclaimed, only to be replaced a few months later by the communist Hungarian Soviet Republic. The revolution failed; the popular Joseph August survived unharmed; and on 6 August, he became head of state of Hungary once again, officially as regent (Reichsverweser) for Charles. He appointed István Friedrich as Prime Minister. When it became apparent that the Allies would not recognise a Habsburg as Hungary's head of state, Joseph August was forced to resign on 23 August 1919.

== Later life ==
In 1920 the Archduke became the first knight of the Hungarian Order of Vitéz, in 1927 he became a member of the newly re-established House of Magnates. He later became an honorary member of the Hungarian Academy of Sciences and was its president from 1936 to 1944. He fled Hungary for the United States in 1944 but later returned to West Germany. In 1957, at the death of the former regent of Hungary, Miklos Horthy, he became the Captain General of the Order of Vitéz. He died in 1962 at Rain, near Straubing.

== Legacy ==
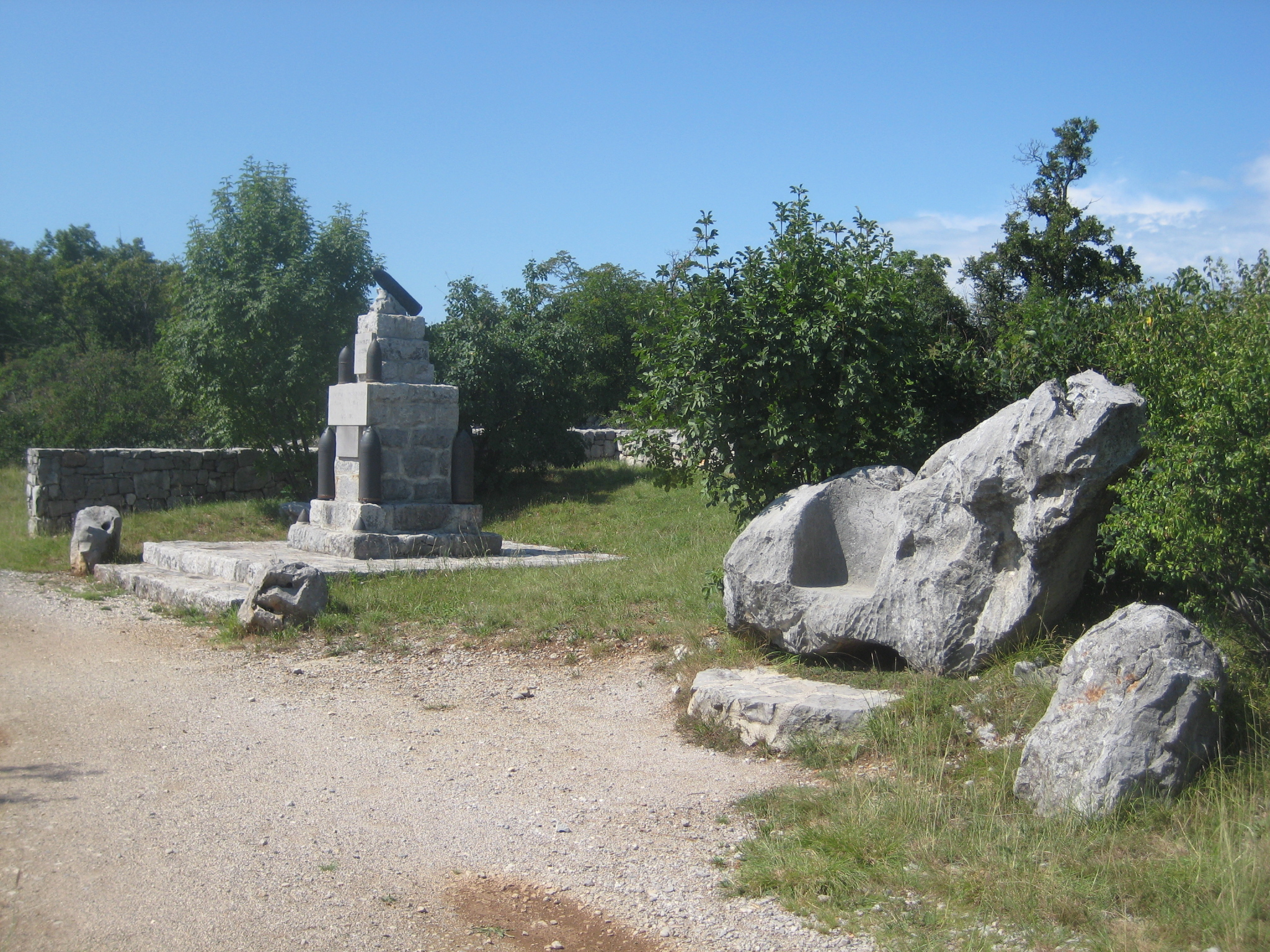
In the front, the Boroevic Throne, named after Svetozar Boroević, near Opatje selo in Slovenia. In the back, a fingerpost and a monument built by the 43rd Infantry Regiment in honour of Archduke Joseph.

The Archduke Joseph Diamond, a 76.02 carat colourless diamond with internal flawless clarity, is named after the Archduke and officially recorded as his property.

== Children ==
His eldest son, Archduke Joseph Francis of Austria, had predeceased him, dying in 1957.

Thus, Joseph August's main heir was his eldest grandson, Archduke Joseph Árpád of Austria (1933–2017), the eldest son of Joseph Francis and his wife, Princess Anna of Saxony. Joseph Árpád married Princess Maria of Löwenstein-Wertheim-Rosenberg, and had children in Joseph August's lifetime. His surviving eldest son is Archduke Joseph Karl (born 1960).

August's granddaughter Archduchess Ilona of Austria (1927–2011) married George Alexander, Duke of Mecklenburg. Her son George Borwin, Duke of Mecklenburg is the current head of the House of Mecklenburg-Strelitz.

== Honours ==
Monarchical styles of Archduke Joseph August of Austria
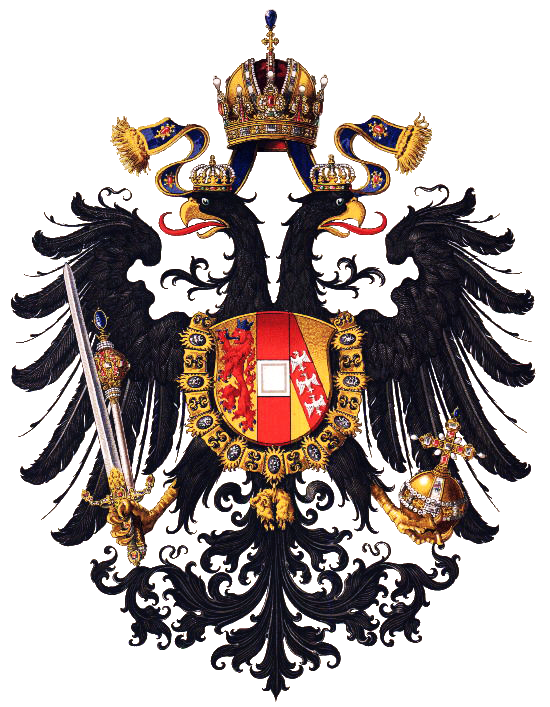
- Reference style: His Imperial and Royal Highness
- Spoken style: Your Imperial and Royal Highness

He received the following orders and decorations:

- Austria-Hungary:
  - Knight of the Golden Fleece, 1891
  - Gold, Silver and Bronze Military Merit Medals on the Ribbon of the Military Merit Cross, with Swords
  - Knight of the Iron Crown, 1st Class with War Decoration and Swords, 1914
  - Grand Cross of the Imperial Order of Leopold, with War Decoration and Swords, 1915
  - Military Merit Cross, 1st Class with War Decoration and Swords, 1916
  - Decoration for Services to the Red Cross, with War Decoration, 1917
  - Commander of the Military Order of Maria Theresa, 1917
  - Grand Cross of the Royal Hungarian Order of St. Stephen, 18 March 1918
- Belgium: Grand Cordon of the Order of Leopold
- Principality of Bulgaria:
  - Grand Cross of St. Alexander, 1895
  - Knight of Saints Cyril and Methodius, 22 June 1912
- Regency Hungary: Captain General of the Order of Vitéz, 1959
- Military Order of Malta: Bailiff Grand Cross of Honour and Devotion, with Breast Cross, 1895
- (Tuscany) Tuscan Grand Ducal Family: Grand Cross of St. Joseph, 1897
- Ottoman Empire: Gold and Silver Imtiyaz Medals
- Persian Empire: Order of the August Portrait, in Diamonds
- Spain: Grand Cross of the Order of Charles III, 25 January 1908
- United Kingdom: Honorary Grand Cross of the Royal Victorian Order, 21 August 1908
- German Empire:
  - Knight of the Black Eagle, 1906
  - Knight of the Red Eagle, 1st Class
  - Iron Cross (1914), 2nd Class, 1 November 1914; 1st Class, 1915
  - Pour le Mérite (military), 30 March 1917; with Oak Leaves, 26 March 1918
  - Bavaria:
    - Knight of St. Hubert, 1893
    - Knight of the Military Merit Order, 4th Class with Swords, 4 July 1916
- Teutonic Order:
  - Marian Cross (Teutonic Order)

== Ancestry ==
Ancestors of Archduke Joseph August of Austria

8. Leopold II, Holy Roman Emperor
4. Archduke Joseph, Palatine of Hungary
9. Infanta Maria Luisa of Spain
2. Archduke Joseph Karl, Palatine of Hungary
10. Duke Louis of Württemberg
5. Duchess Maria Dorothea of Württemberg
11. Princess Henriette of Nassau-Weilburg
1. Archduke Joseph August, Palatine of Hungary
12. Prince Ferdinand of Saxe-Coburg and Gotha
6. Prince August of Saxe-Coburg and Gotha
13. Princess Maria Antonia Koháry of Csábrág and Szitnya
3. Princess Clotilde of Saxe-Coburg and Gotha
14. Louis Philippe I of France
7. Princess Clémentine of Orléans
15. Princess Maria Amalia of Naples and Sicily

== Bibliography ==
- Cunliffe-Owen, Marguerite. Keystone of Empire: Francis Joseph of Austria. New York: Harper, 1903.
- Gerő, András. Emperor Francis Joseph: King of the Hungarians. Boulder, Colo.: Social Science Monographs, 2001.
- Palmer, Alan. Twilight of the Habsburgs: The Life and Times of Emperor Francis Joseph. New York: Weidenfeld & Nicolson, 1995.
- Van der Kiste, John. Emperor Francis Joseph: Life, Death and the Fall of the Habsburg Empire. Stroud, England: Sutton, 2005.
- Schad, Martha,Kaiserin Elisabeth und ihre Töchter. München, Langen Müller, 1998

Honorary titles
Preceded by Archduke Joseph Karl	Palatine of Hungary; 1905–1918	Title abolished
Preceded by Miklós Horthy	Captain General of the Order of Vitéz; 1959–1962	Succeeded by Ferenc Farkas
Political offices
Preceded by Gyula Peidl as Acting Head of State	Regent of Hungary; 1919	Succeeded by István Friedrich as Acting Head of State
Cultural offices
Preceded by Albert Berzeviczy	President of the Hungarian Academy of Sciences; 1936–1944	Succeeded by Gyula Kornis
