= Archduke Joseph Francis of Austria =

Archduke of Austria and Prince of Hungary

Archduke Josef Franz
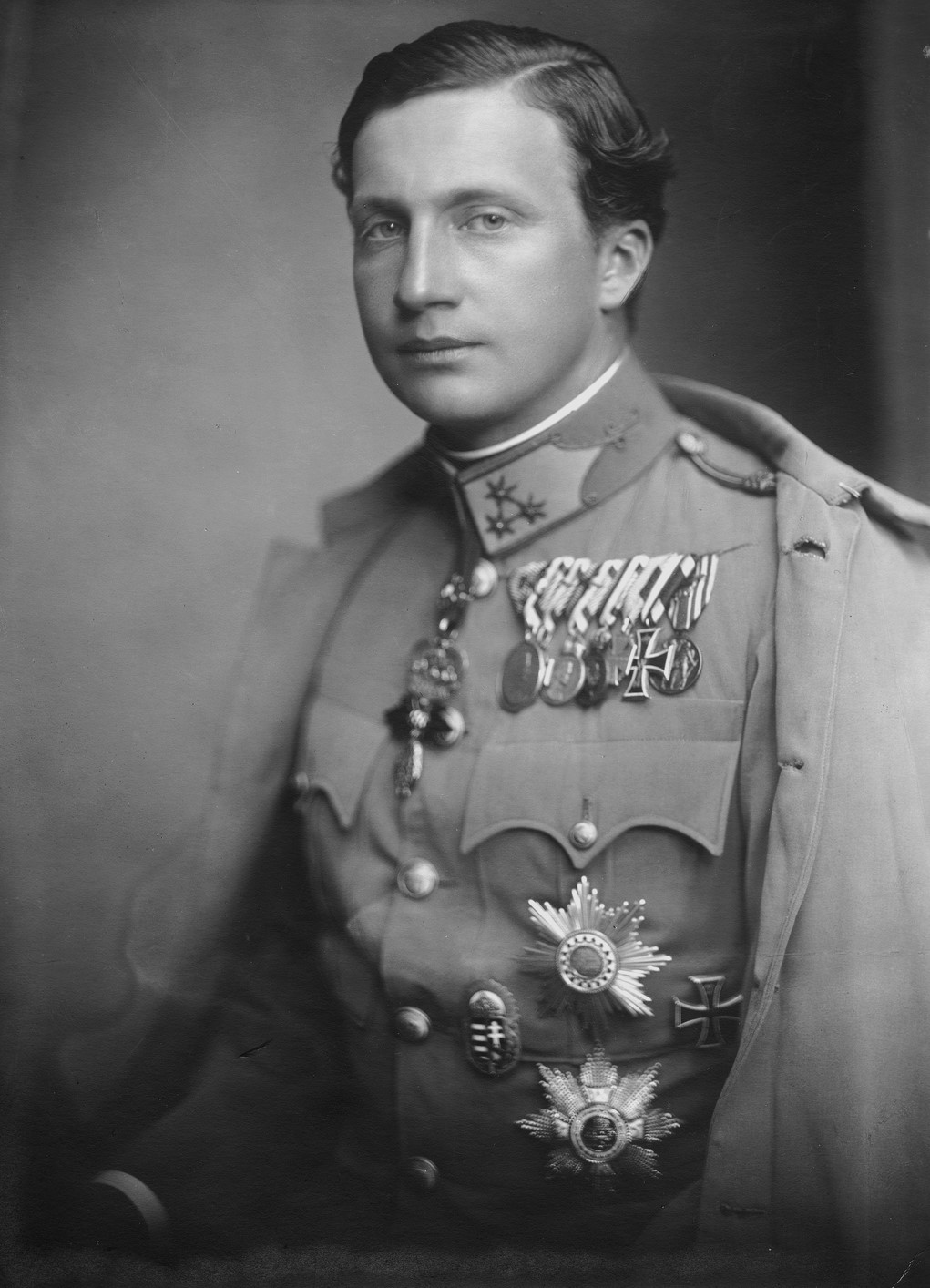
- Archduke Josef Franz, c. 1927
- Born: 28 March 1895; Brünn, Moravia, Austria-Hungary
- Died: 25 September 1957 (aged 62); Carcavelos, Portugal
- Burial: Palatinal Crypt, Budapest
- Spouse: Princess Anna of Saxony (m. 1924)
- Issue Detail: Archduchess Margaret, Princess of Monteleone; Archduchess Ilona; Archduchess Anna-Theresia; Archduke Joseph Árpád; Archduke István Dominik; Archduchess Maria Kynga; Archduke Géza; Archduke Michael
Names
- Josef Franz Leopold Anton Ignatius Maria
- House: Habsburg-Lorraine
- Father: Archduke Joseph August of Austria
- Mother: Princess Auguste of Bavaria

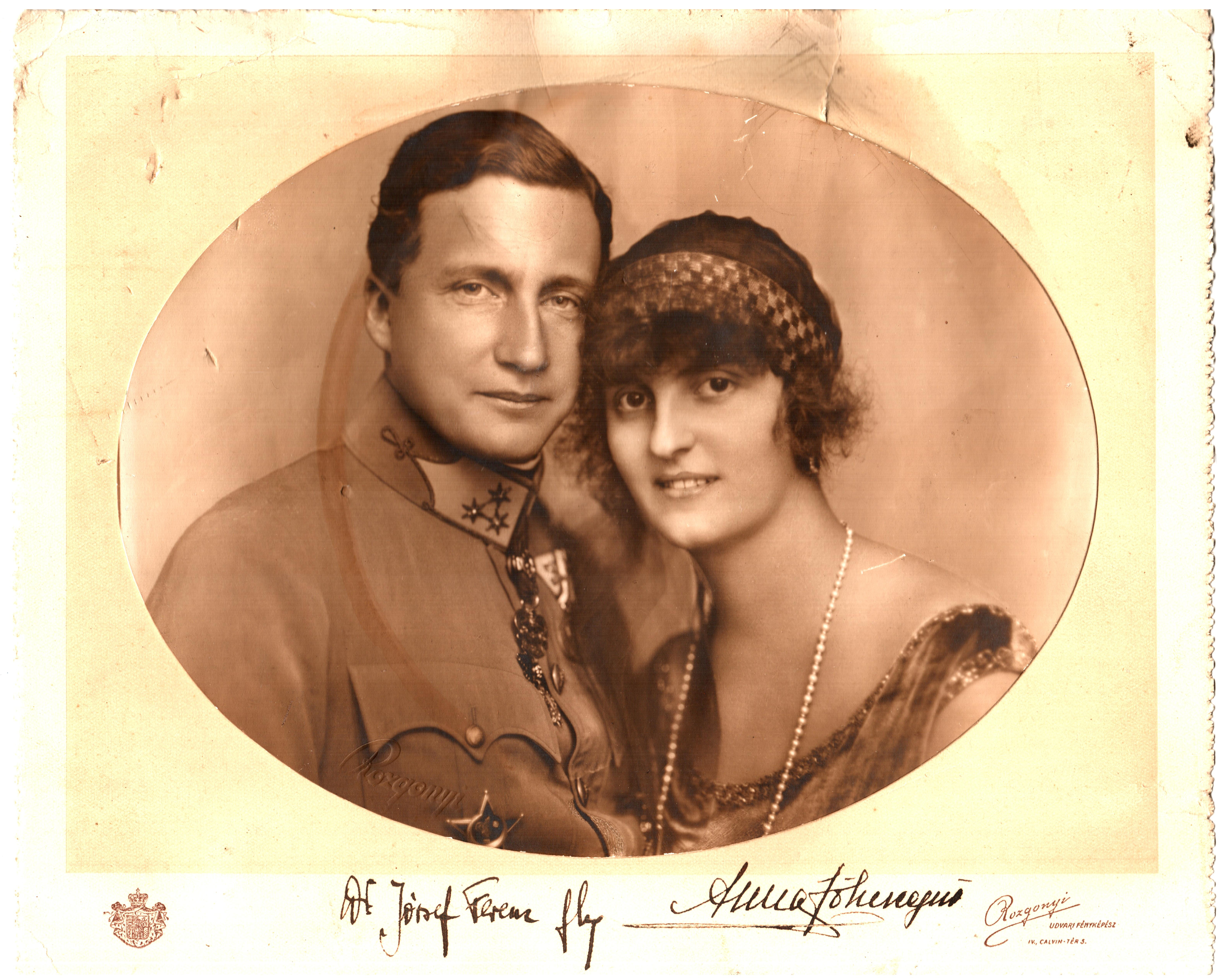
Princess Anna of Saxony and Archduke Joseph Francis of Austria

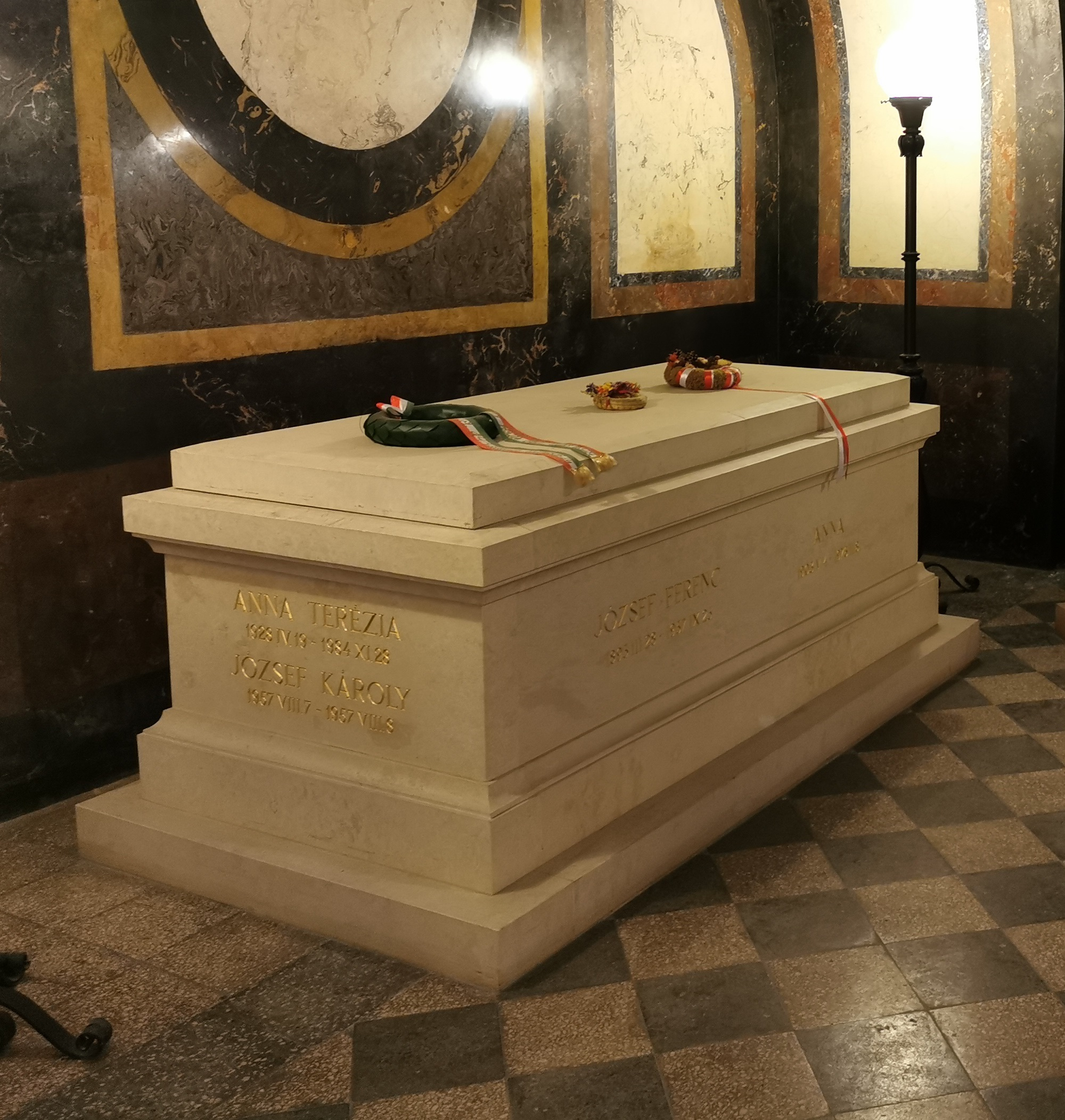
Tomb of Archduke Joseph Francis and his family in the Palatinal Crypt, Budapest

Josef Franz, Archduke of Austria, Prince of Hungary (Josef Franz Leopold Anton Ignatius Maria; 28 March 1895 – 25 September 1957), was the eldest son of Archduke Joseph August of Austria and Princess Auguste Maria of Bavaria. As his father was the last Palatine of Hungary and was briefly considered a potential King of Hungary in 1919–1920, Josef Franz was a potential crown prince of Hungary. He was born during the reign of his maternal great-grandfather, Emperor Franz Joseph I of Austria.

He wrote the libretto to Eugene Zador's 1939 opera Christopher Columbus.

== Marriage and issue ==
Styles of Archduke Joseph Francis of Austria
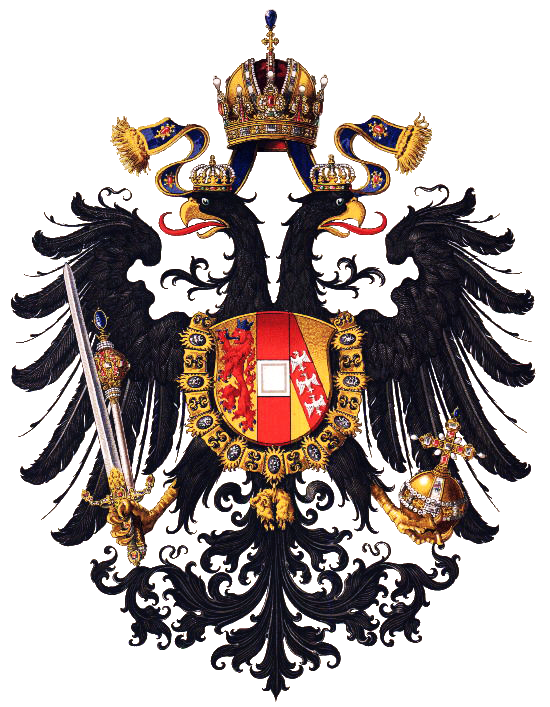
- Reference style: His Imperial and Royal Highness
- Spoken style: Your Imperial and Royal Highness

On 4 October 1924, Archduke Josef Franz married Princess Anna of Saxony, a daughter of Friedrich August III of Saxony and Archduchess Luise of Austria-Tuscany. Anna and Joseph Francis had eight children:

- Archduchess Margaret of Austria (17 August 1925 – 3 May 1979), married Alexander Cech in August 1944, and had issue.
- Archduchess Ilona of Austria (20 April 1927 – 11 January 2011), married Georg Alexander, Duke of Mecklenburg in 1946, and had issue.
- Archduchess Anna-Theresia of Austria (19 April 1928 – 28 November 1984), died unmarried without issue.
- Archduke Joseph Árpád of Austria (8 February 1933 – 30 April 2017), married Princess Maria von Löwenstein-Wertheim-Rosenberg in 1956, and had issue.
- Archduke István Dominik of Austria (1 July 1934 – 24 October 2011), married Maria Anderl in 1959, leaving issue.
- Archduchess Maria Kynga of Austria (born 27 August 1938), married Ernst Kiss in 1959, and subsequently remarried Joachim Krist in 1988.
- Archduke Géza of Austria (born 14 November 1940), married Monika Decker in 1965, and subsequently remarried Elizabeth Jane Kunstadter in 1992, leaving issue.
- Archduke Michael of Austria (born 5 May 1942), married Princess Christiana of Löwenstein-Wertheim-Rosenberg in 1966, leaving issue, including Eduard Habsburg-Lothringen.

Archduke Joseph Francis of Austria died on 25 September 1957 in Carcavelos, on the Portuguese Riviera.

== Ancestry ==
Ancestors of Archduke Joseph Francis of Austria

8. Archduke Joseph, Palatine of Hungary
4. Archduke Joseph Karl, Palatine of Hungary
9. Duchess Maria Dorothea of Württemberg
2. Archduke Joseph August, Palatine of Hungary
10. Prince August of Saxe-Coburg and Gotha
5. Princess Clotilde of Saxe-Coburg and Gotha
11. Princess Clémentine of Orléans
1. Archduke Joseph Francis of Austria
12. Luitpold, Prince Regent of Bavaria
6. Prince Leopold of Bavaria
13. Archduchess Auguste Ferdinande of Austria
3. Princess Auguste of Bavaria
14. Franz Joseph I of Austria
7. Archduchess Gisela of Austria
15. Duchess Elisabeth in Bavaria
