= Charles Wilda =

Austrian painter (1854–1907)

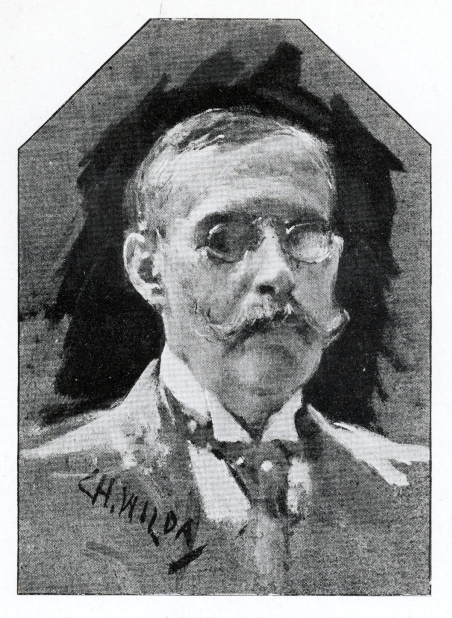
Self-portrait

Charles Wilda, originally Karl (20 December 1854, Vienna – 11 June 1907, Vienna) was an Austrian Orientalist painter. He was the elder brother of the painter, Gottfried Wilda.

== Biography ==
He studied with Leopold Carl Müller at the Academy of Fine Arts Vienna. It was Müller who first introduced him to Orientalist painting, having himself acquired that interest from Eugène Fromentin in Paris. In 1903, the Viennese art critic, Ludwig Hevesi, declared Wilda to be Müller's true successor.

He often stayed in Cairo for extended periods, and scenes of the daily street life there compose the bulk of his works. In 1892, he undertook a journey through North Africa with his friend, the sculptor Arthur Strasser, which provided additional inspiration.

Beginning in the 1880s, he was a regular exhibitor at events in Vienna, Berlin, Munich and Dresden. He was also represented by several works at the Exposition Universelle (1900).

In 1895, he was awarded the Kaiserpreis for art and, in 1898, was presented with a small, golden State Medal. Two of his paintings were acquired for the Imperial Collection of Kaiser Franz Joseph I.

Following his death, the Vienna Künstlerhaus honored him at their Autumn Exposition with over fifty of his oil paintings being featured. He was interred at the Wiener Zentralfriedhof. His grave is adorned with a monument created in 1909 by Hella Unger (1875-1932).

== Selected paintings ==
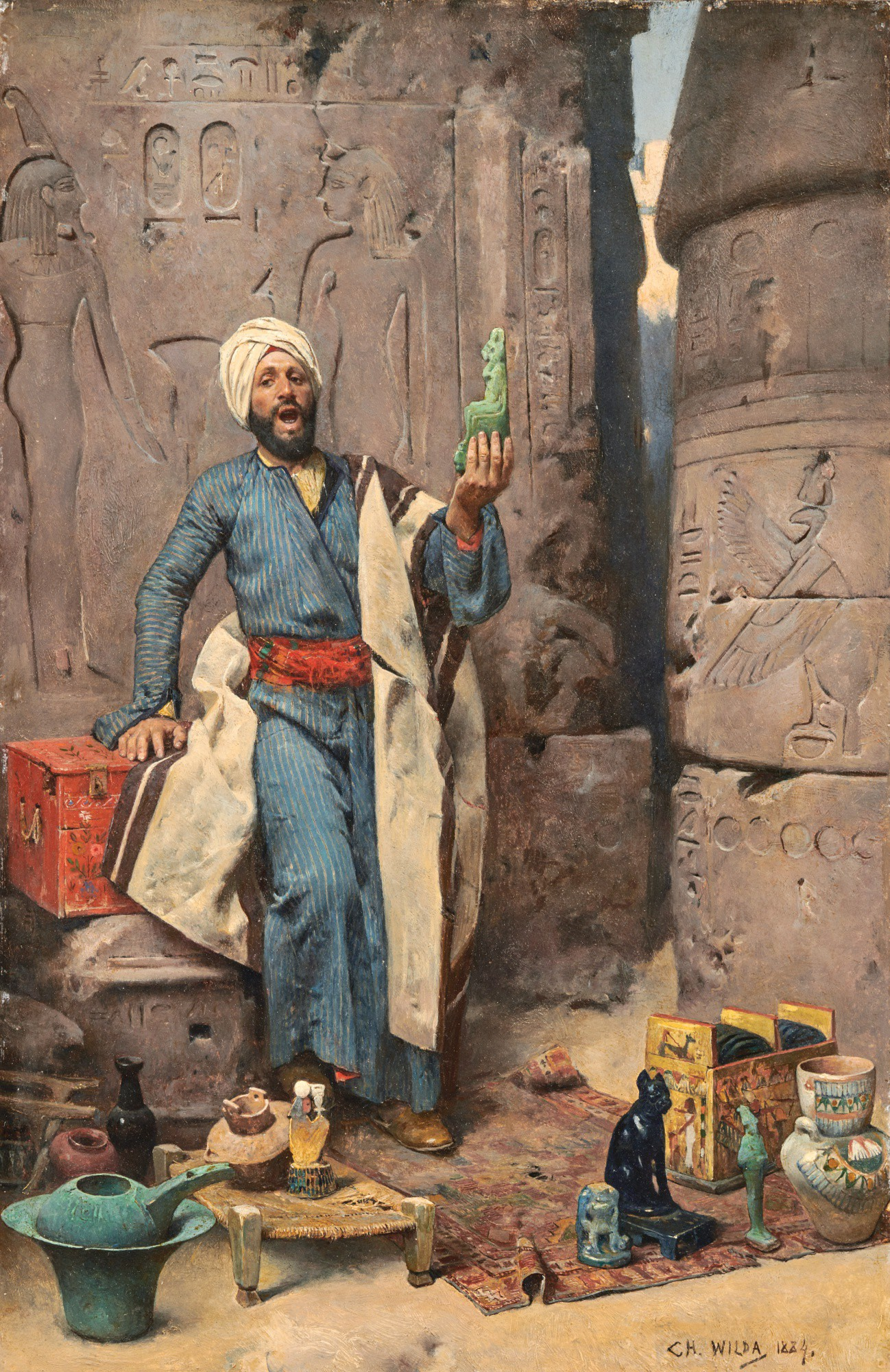
The Antiques Seller

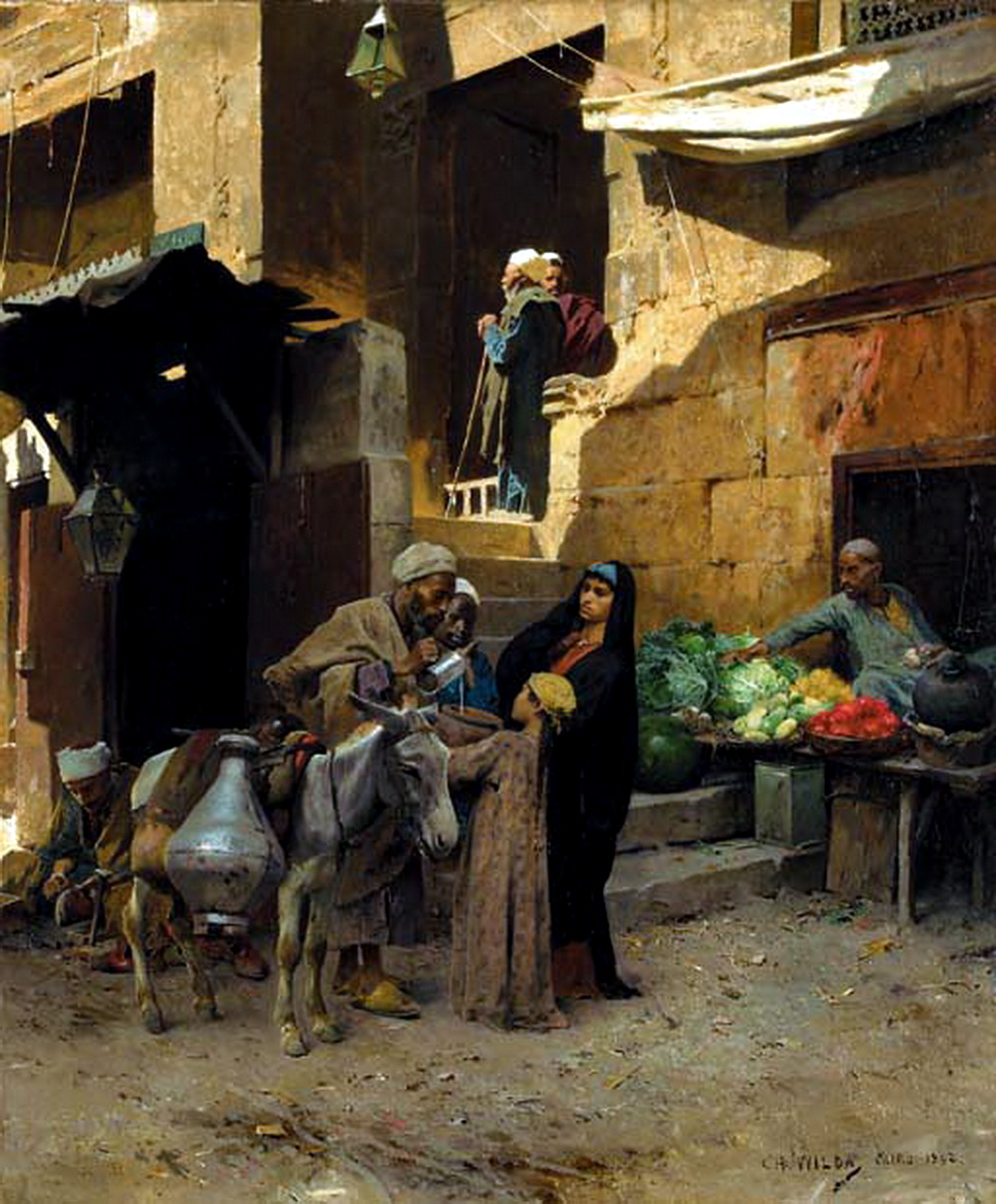
Inside the Souk

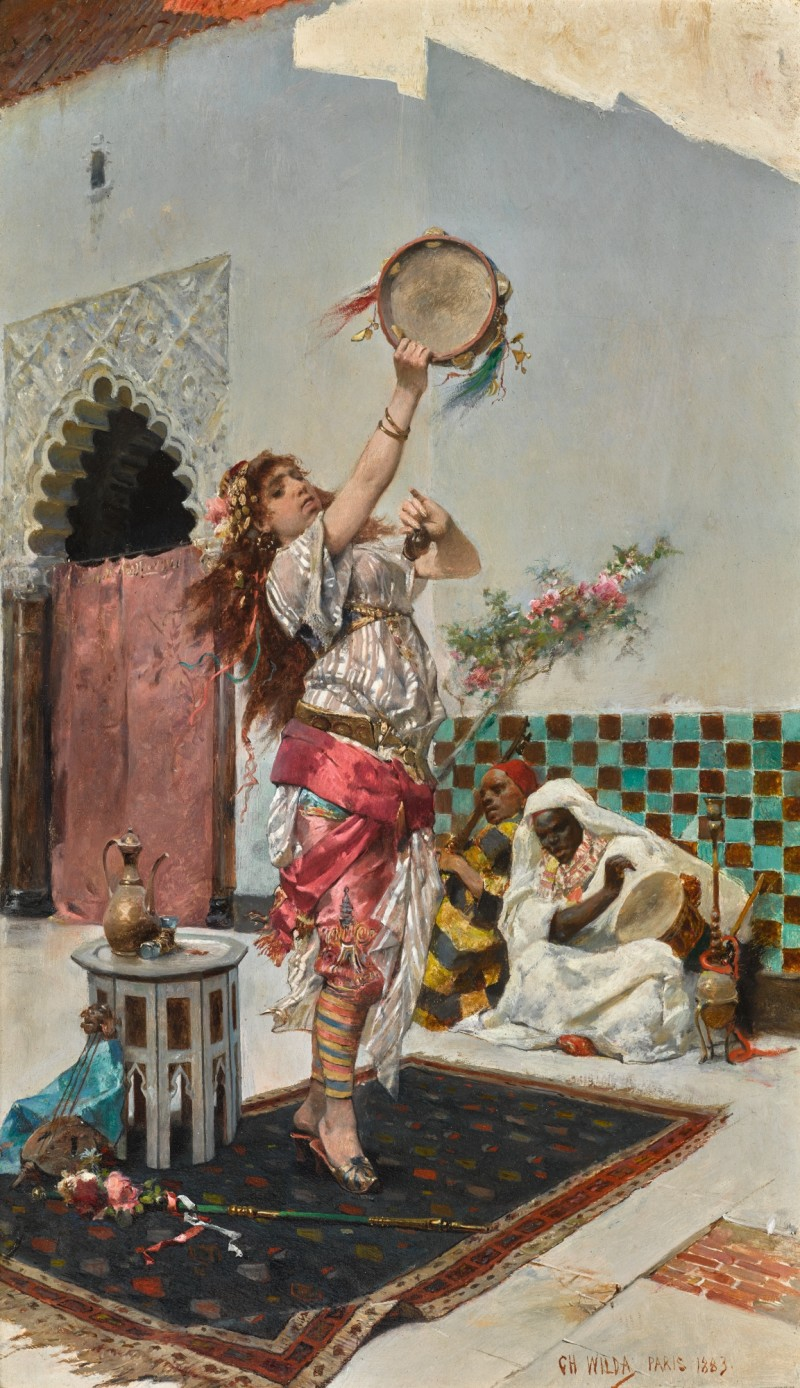
The Dancer

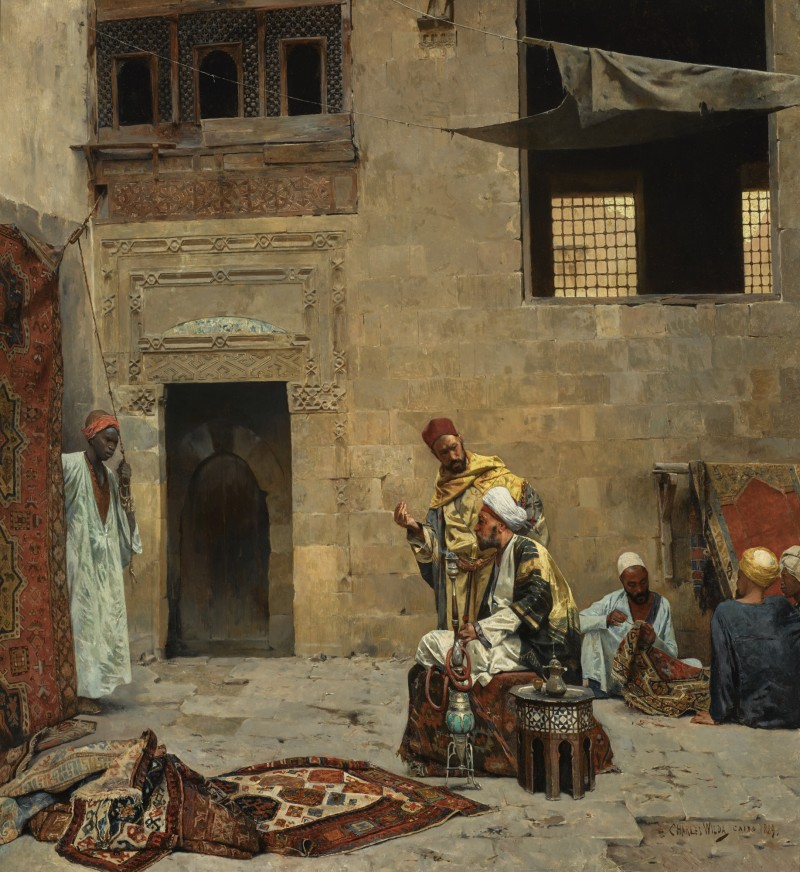
The Carpet Merchants

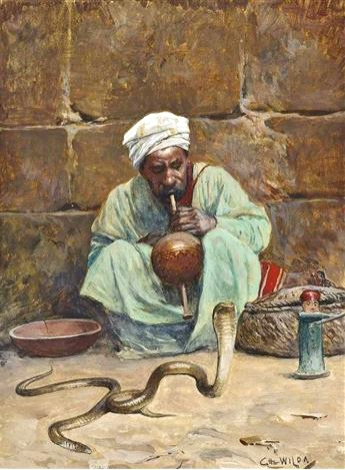
The Snake Charmer
