= Marian Cross (Teutonic Order) =

The Marian Cross is a historic award of the Teutonic Order.

== History ==
Archduke Wilhelm Franz of Austria instituted the award during his time as Grand Master of the Teutonic Order on March 26 1871. Even though it was mainly created to sustain the Order financially, its recipients had to be noble and of legal age. Recipients were expected to donate an amount of at least 25 Gulden annually. Since November 20 1880, Non-Austrians could receive the award for a one-time donation of 500 Gulden.

== Decoration ==
Until 1886, the cross was worn on a black silk ribbon. Thereafter, it was worn on a ribbon with black and white stripes. Manufacturers included:

- FR – F. Rothe, Vienna
- WM – Vinc. Mayer, Vienna
- G.A.S. – Scheid, Vienna
- HUW – Hauptmünzamt Vienna

== Recipients ==
see Category:Recipients of the Marian Cross
