= Géza von Habsburg =

Austrian art historian and curator (born 1940)

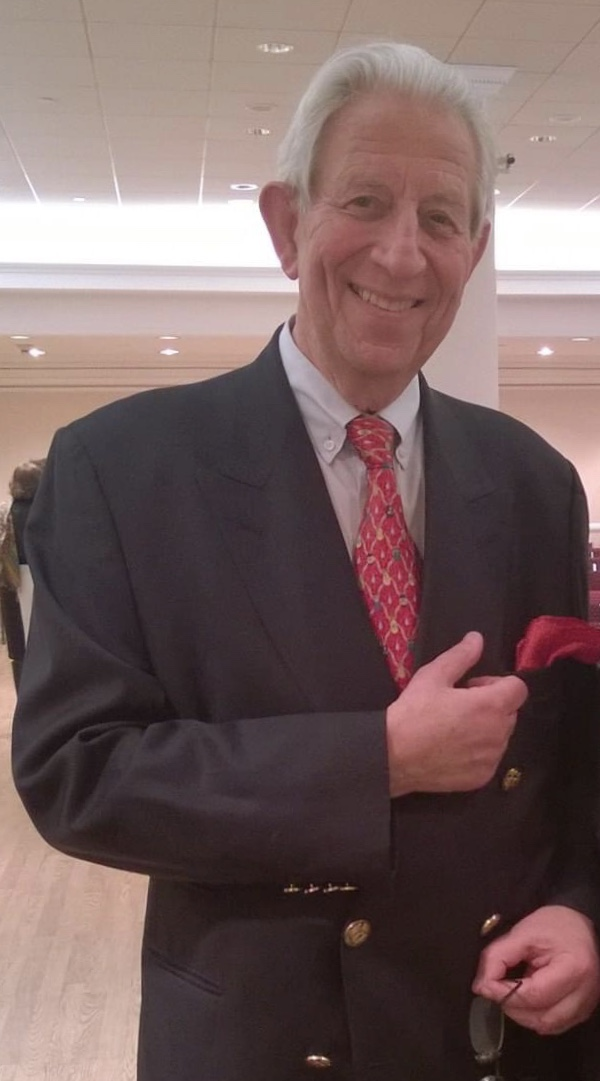
- Géza von Habsburg in 2014
- Born: 14 November 1940 (age 85); Budapest, Hungary
- Spouse: Monika Decker (m. 1965; div. 1991) Elizabeth Jane Kunstadter (m. 1992)
- Issue: 4
Names
- Géza Ladislaus Euseb Gerhard Rafael Albert Maria von Habsburg
- House: House of Habsburg-Lorraine
- Father: Archduke Joseph Francis of Austria
- Mother: Princess Anna of Saxony
- Occupation: Curator and art historian

Géza Ladislaus Euseb Gerhard Rafael Albert Maria von Habsburg (born 14 November 1940) is a Hungarian Fabergé expert who has published books and articles on the jewellers Peter Carl Fabergé and Victor Mayer. He is the curator of several major international Fabergé exhibitions. Géza von Habsburg coined the term Fauxbergé. As a member of the House of Habsburg-Lorraine, he holds the abolished but courtesy titles of Archduke of Austria, Prince of Hungary and Bohemia, with the style of Imperial and Royal Highness.

== Life ==
Géza von Habsburg is the son of Archduke Joseph Francis of Austria (1895–1957) and his wife Princess Anna of Saxony (1903–1976); thus, he is a grandson of King Frederick Augustus III of Saxony, great-great-grandson of Emperor Franz Joseph I of Austria and great-great-great-great-grandson of Emperor Leopold II, Holy Roman Emperor. Géza attended universities in Fribourg and Bern, Switzerland; Munich, Germany; and Florence, Italy, before graduating as a Doctor of Philosophy from the University of Fribourg in 1965.

In 1966 he joined the staff of Christie, Manson & Woods Auctioneers as Chairman, Switzerland, overseeing a network of offices throughout Europe. In 1980 he became Chairman of European Operations for the company. Later in his career, he served for four years as chairman, New York and Geneva, of Habsburg Fine Art International Auctioneers. In both companies, he specialized in silver and gold, objects of vertu and Russian art. Since 1998, he has been based in New York.

Géza von Habsburg is an internationally renowned author and leading authority on Fabergé. Much of his career has been devoted to organizing and curating exhibitions all over the world. He served as the curator and organizer for Fabergé, Jeweller to the Tsars (1986–87) at the Kunsthalle in Munich. Also, while a Board Member of the Fabergé Arts Foundation, he was Chief Curator of Fabergé, Imperial Court Jeweller (1993–94), which was shown in Saint Petersburg, Paris and London. He also served as guest curator of Fabergé in America, which toured five cities in the United States (1996–97).

As an educator, Géza von Habsburg served as an associate professor at the New York School of Interior Design, the Bard Graduate Center for Studies in the Decorative Arts, and New York University. He is currently a lecturer for the Metropolitan Museum of Art in New York. Some of his topics include "Princely Collections," "The Habsburgs as Collectors and Patrons of the Arts", and "Celebrated Habsburg Women".

Fluent in seven languages, Géza joined Fabergé Co. in 1994 as a consultant, spokesman and lecturer worldwide. He has written seven and co-written two books on Fabergé and related topics, as well as some 75 articles, which have been published in various art journals all over the world. In addition, he has been featured in a Russian film (1994), a Japanese film and two biographies for the Arts & Entertainment Networks (A&E), all in association with Fabergé.

Géza has also been featured in the A&E documentary Treasures of the Habsburgs (1998), and in Habsburgs Today on the Romance Channel (1999).

== Marriage and children ==
On 7 July 1965, his first marriage was to Monika Decker (born 1 December 1939 at Frankfurt-am-Main, Germany). As he contracted a morganatic marriage, he has to renounce his ancestral dynastic rights and regal titles for the downgraded title of Count von Habsburg. Together, they have three sons.

Géza and Monika Decker were divorced on 23 September 1991, and their marriage was annulled 6 July 1993.

On 4 January 1992, he married civilly (and religiously on 1 Dec 1993) Elizabeth Jane Kunstadter (born 1957), with whom he has a daughter.

Elizabeth von Habsburg graduated from Stanford University and received a master's degree in international relations from Columbia University. Her parents run the philanthropic Albert Kunstadter Family Foundation in New York.
