= House of Habsburg-Lorraine =

Austrian imperial dynasty

House of Habsburg-Lorraine Haus Habsburg-Lothringen
- Frankish-Germanic imperial house
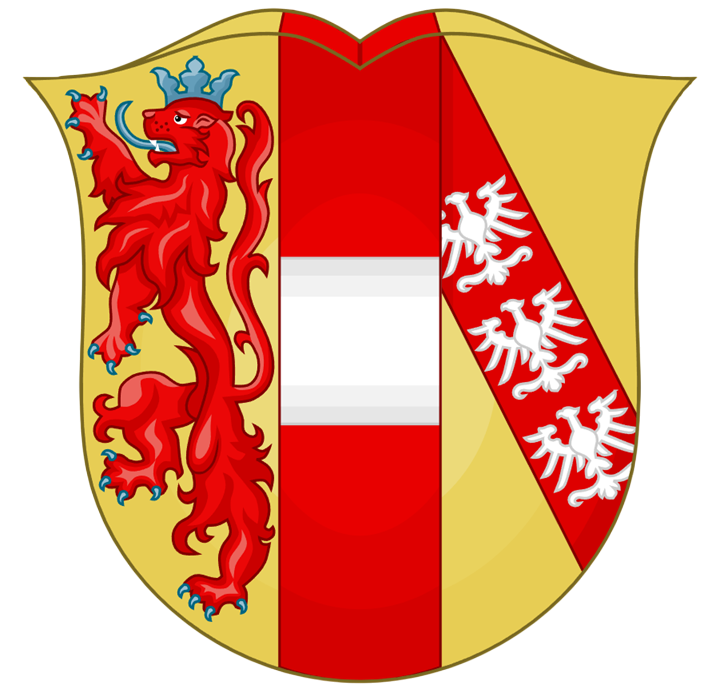
- Parent house: Habsburg (enatic); Lorraine (agnatic)
- Country: Holy Roman Empire; Austrian Empire; Austrian Netherlands; German Confederation; Austro-Hungarian Empire; Second Mexican Empire; Grand Duchy of Tuscany; Duchy of Modena and Reggio; Duchy of Parma; Countless other realms and territories according to the list of the Grand title of the Emperor of Austria
- Founded: 1736; 290 years ago
- Founder: Maria Theresa, Holy Roman Empress & Francis I, Holy Roman Emperor
- Current head: Karl von Habsburg-Lothringen
- Final ruler: Austria-Hungary: Charles I & IV; (1916–1918); Mexico: Maximilian I; (1864–1867); Tuscany: Ferdinand IV; (1859–1860); Modena: Francis V; (1846–1859)
- Titles: List of titles: Holy Roman Emperor (1745–1806); Emperor of Austria (1804–1918); Emperor of Mexico (1864–1867); King of the Romans (1745–1806); King of Bohemia (1740–1918); King of Croatia (1740–1918); King of Hungary (1740–1918); Archduke of Austria (1740–1804); Palatine of Hungary (1790–1918); Grand Duke of Tuscany (1737–1859); Duke of Modena and Reggio (1814–1859); Duchess of Parma, Piancenza, and Guastalla (1814–1847); Countless other realms including Germany, Poland, Italy, Romania, the Low Countries, Cumania, Bulgaria, etc. etc. (see more)
- Styles: Imperial and Royal Highness; Apostolic Majesty; Majesty; Grace
- Motto: A.E.I.O.U. and Viribus Unitis
- Deposition: Austria-Hungary: 1918 (Charles I & IV relinquished participation in state affairs following the end of World War I)
- Cadet branches: Habsburg-Este (agnatic); Habsburg-Tuscany (agnatic); Habsburg-Hohenberg (agnatic)

The House of Habsburg-Lorraine (German: Haus Habsburg-Lothringen) originated from the marriage in 1736 of Francis III, Duke of Lorraine and Bar, and Maria Theresa of Austria, later successively Queen of Bohemia, Queen of Hungary, Queen of Germany, Queen of Croatia and Archduchess of Austria, etc. Its members form the legitimate surviving line of both the House of Habsburg and the House of Lorraine, and they inherited their patrimonial possessions from the female line of the House of Habsburg and from the male line of the House of Lorraine.

The House of Lorraine's branch of Vaudémont and Guise became the main branch after a brief interlude in 1453–1473, when the duchy passed in right of Charles de Bourbon's daughter to her husband, John of Calabria, a Capetian. Lorraine reverted to the House of Vaudémont, a junior branch of the House of Lorraine, in the person of René II, who later added to his titles that of Duke of Bar.

The House of Habsburg takes its name from Habsburg Castle, a fortress built in the 1020s by Count Radbot of Klettgau in Aargau (now in Switzerland). His grandson, Otto II, was the first to take on the name of the fortress as his own, adding Graf von Habsburg ("Count of Habsburg") to his title. The House of Habsburg gathered dynastic momentum during the 11th, 12th and 13th centuries, and in 1273, Radbot's seventh-generation descendant, Rudolph of Habsburg, became Roman-German King. He moved the family's power base to the Duchy of Austria, which the Habsburgs ruled until 1918.

The House of Habsburg-Lorraine still exists today, and the head of the family is Karl von Habsburg. The current house orders are the Order of the Golden Fleece, the Imperial and Royal Order of Saint George and the Order of the Starry Cross.

== History of the House of Habsburg-Lorraine ==
The first member of the House of Habsburg-Lorraine to rule over the Holy Roman Empire was Joseph II, a sovereign raised during the Enlightenment. By the new ideals he brought, he implemented many reforms, most of which were to the detriment of the clergy. Upon his death in 1790, he was succeeded by his brother Leopold II, who in 1791 invited Europe's powers to help the French royal family stifle the ideals of the revolution without military intervention. He died a few days before France declared war on Austria.

In 1792, Leopold II's son Francis II was crowned emperor in Frankfurt. After the beheading of the French sovereigns, he – along with the other European sovereigns – created the First Coalition against Revolutionary France. The coalition initially recorded some success but soon began to withdraw, especially in Italy, where the Austrians were repeatedly defeated by the French General Napoleon Bonaparte.

With the Treaty of Campo Formio in 1797, the Duchy of Milan was handed over to France, while the Austrians gained Veneto, Istria and Dalmatia. This pact was followed by others that reduced the dominion of the Habsburgs to Austria, Bohemia and Hungary. Francis II was also forced to dissolve the Holy Roman Empire, but he had already proclaimed himself Emperor of Austria, in order to retain his imperial status.

After the defeats at Leipzig (1813) and Waterloo (1815), Napoleon was exiled to the island of Saint Helena, where he died. In the same year as Waterloo, the Congress of Vienna was established, with which the Restoration began. The Congress demanded the restoration of the old regimes. Austria recovered all the Italian, Slavic and German territories that it had lost during the Napoleonic Wars, and the Holy Alliance was also established between Austria, Russia and Prussia, which had the task of suppressing all the pro-French or independence revolutionary movements that would have erupted in Europe.

In the years that followed, Francis II pursued a centralization policy on the advice of Chancellor Metternich; but precisely because of it, and emerging ideals of independence, the Revolutions of 1848 broke out, which wracked all of Europe. This led to the expulsion of Metternich from the Imperial Chancellery and the rise of Franz Joseph, replacing Ferdinand I, who was forced to abdicate in favour of the 18-year-old man.

=== End of the dynasty's rule in Europe ===
Franz Joseph (1830–1916) was the last member of the House of Habsburg-Lorraine to hold any significant political or military authority in Europe. At the beginning of his reign (1848–1916), Austria was the dominant power in Central Europe, whilst Vienna emerged as one of the greatest metropolitan cities on the continent. The emperor, however, waged the Second Italian War of Independence and the Austro-Prussian War. Both ended in defeats, which put an end to Austrian supremacy in Italy and Germany, as well as accelerating the gradual decline of the dynasty.

In 1867, Franz Joseph granted effective autonomy to the Kingdom of Hungary within the Austrian Empire under the terms of the Ausgleich; politically and militarily they were united, but in terms of internal policy and administration, they became separate entities. The title of the head of state became "Emperor of Austria and King of Hungary", although he was also referred to as "Emperor of Austria-Hungary".

With the growing interest of Austria-Hungary and Russia in the Balkans, strong tensions were created between the Habsburgs and Russia, eventually leading Austria-Hungary to enter into an alliance with Germany and Italy.

In 1914, with the assassination of Archduke Franz Ferdinand in Sarajevo, the First World War broke out between the Central Powers (Austria-Hungary, Germany, Bulgaria and the Ottoman Empire) and the Entente Powers (the British Empire, France, Russia and others).

In 1916, Franz Joseph died and was succeeded by his grandnephew, Charles I. Charles (the last sovereign), upon losing the war, renounced the exercise of power but did not abdicate. He was forced into exile on April 3, 1919. The Habsburg dominions were subsequently divided into independent republics.

The House of Habsburg-Lorraine refused to swear its allegiance to the new Republic of Austria, therefore family members were forced into exile and their property was confiscated. The law of exile still applies to the descendants of Emperor Charles under the same conditions. In 1961, Otto von Habsburg, the late head of the house and formerly a member of the European Parliament, relinquished the monarchy and the succession rights of his descendants in exchange for an end to exile. He was known in the Republic of Austria as Dr. Otto Habsburg-Lothringen, since the Republic does not officially recognise titles of nobility.

=== The dynasty today ===
The current leader of the House of Habsburg-Lorraine is Karl von Habsburg, who succeeded his father Otto as head of the imperial house after his father renounced the role in 2007. Karl is the eldest grandson of the last emperor of Austria-Hungary, Charles I, and his heir apparent is his eldest son, Ferdinand Habsburg, an Austrian racing driver.

== Male-line family tree ==
- Leopold II, Holy Roman Emperor (1747–1792)
  - Emperor Francis I (1768–1835)
    - Emperor Ferdinand I (1793–1875)
    - Archduke Franz Karl (1802–1878)
      - Emperor Franz Joseph I (1830–1916)
        - Crown Prince Rudolf (1858–1889)
      - Emperor Maximilian I of Mexico (1832–1867); married to Charlotte of Belgium
      - Archduke Karl Ludwig (1833–1896)
        - Archduke Franz Ferdinand (1863–1914); morganatic marriage to Sophie, Duchess of Hohenberg
        - Archduke Otto Francis (1865–1906)
          - Emperor Charles I (1887–1922)
            - Crown Prince Otto (1912–2011)
              - Archduke Charles (born 1961)
                - (1) Ferdinand, Crown Prince of Austria (b. 1997)
              - (2) Archduke George (b. 1964); married to Duchess Eilika of Oldenburg
                - (3) Archduke Charles Constantine (b. 2004)
            - Archduke Robert of Austria-Este (1915–1996)
              - (4) Archduke Laurence of Austria-Este (b. 1955); married to Princess Astrid of Belgium
                - (5) Archduke Amadeus of Austria-Este (b. 1986); married to Elizabeth Mary Rosboch von Wolkenstein
                  - (6) Archduke Maximilian of Austria-Este (b. 2019)
                - (7) Archduke Joachim of Austria-Este (b. 1991)
              - (8) Archduke Gerhard of Austria-Este (b. 1957); married to Iris Jandrasits
              - (9) Archduke Martin of Austria-Este (b. 1959); married to Princess Catherine of Isenburg
                - (10) Archduke Bartholomew of Austria-Este (b. 2006)
                - (11) Archduke Emmanuel of Austria-Este (b. 2008)
                - (12) Archduke Louis Amadeus of Austria-Este (b. 2011)
            - Archduke Felix (1916–2011)
              - (13) Archduke Charles Philip (b. 1954); married in 1994 to (1) [divorced (and annulled?) in 1997] Martina Donath, (2) [civilly (and religiously?)] Annie-Claire Lacrambe, two sons, one by each marriage (eldest born before marriage).
                - (14) Archduke Louis Damian (b. 1998)
              - Archduke Raymond (1958–2008), married to Bettina Götz
                - (15) Archduke Felix (b. 1996)
              - (16) Archduke Stephen (b. 1961), married to Paola de Temesváry
                - (17) Archduke Andrew (b. 1994)
                - (18) Archduke Paul (b. 1997); married to Antonia Lütz
            - Archduke Charles Louis (1918–2007)
              - (19) Archduke Rudolf (b. 1950); married to Baroness Hélène de Villenfagne de Vogelsanck (marriage retroactively approved as dynastic)
                - (20) Archduke Charles Christian (b. 1977); married to Estelle Lapra de Saint-Romain
                  - (21) Archduke Peter George (b. 2021)
                - (22) Father Johannes Habsburg-Lorraine (b. 1981), a priest of the Eucharistein Community
                - (23) Archduke Thomas (b. 1986)
                - (24) Archduke Francis Louis (b. 1988); married to Mathilde Vignon
                - (25) Archduke Michael (b. 1990)
                - (26) Archduke Joseph (b. 1991); married to Marie-Gabrielle Pélissié du Rausas
              - (27) Archduke Charles Christian (b. 1954); married to Princess Mary Astrid of Luxembourg
                - (28) Archduke Imre (b. 1985); married to Kathleen Walker
                  - (29) Archduke Charles (b. 2023)
                - (30) Archduke Christopher (b. 1988), married to Adélaïde Drapé-Frisch
                  - (31) Archduke Joseph (b. 2020)
                - (32) Archduke Alexander (b. 1990); married to Natacha Roumiantzeff-Pachkevitch
            - Archduke Rudolf (1919–2010)
              - (33) Archduke Charles Peter (b. 1955); married to Princess Alexandra of Wrede
                - (34) Archduke Laurence (b. 2003)
              - (35) Archduke Simeon (b. 1958); married to Princess Mary Dove of the Two Sicilies
                - (36) Archduke John (b. 1997)
                - (37) Archduke Louis (b. 1998)
                - (38) Archduke Philip (b. 2007)
          - Archduke Maximilian Eugene (1895–1952)
            - Archduke Ferdinand (1918–2004)
              - (39) Archduke Maximilian (b. 1961); married to Sara Maya Al-Askari
                - (40) Archduke Charles Otto Nicholas Ferdinand (b. 2005)
                - (41) Archduke Constantine (b. 2007)
            - Archduke Henry (1925–2014)
              - (42) Archduke Philip (b. 1962); married to Mayasuni Heath
              - (43) Archduke Ferdinand (b. 1965); married to Countess Catherine of Hardenberg
                - (44) Archduke Jacob Maximilian (b. 2002)
              - (45) Archduke Konrad (b. 1971); married to Ashmita Goswami.
  - Ferdinand III of Tuscany (1769–1824), founder of the Tuscany branch of the imperial house.
    - Leopold II of Tuscany (1797–1870)
      - Ferdinand IV of Tuscany (1835–1908)
        - Archduke Peter Ferdinand (1874–1948)
          - Archduke Godfrey (1902–1984)
            - Archduke Leopold Francis (1942–2021)
              - (46) Archduke Sigismund, Grand Duke of Tuscany (b. 1966); married to Elyssa Edmonstone
                - (47) Archduke Leopold, Grand Prince of Tuscany (b. 2001)
                - (48) Archduke Maximilian (b. 2004)
              - (49) Archduke Guntram (b. 1967); morganatically (in Tuscany) married to Debora de Sola, recognised as Countess Deborah of Habsburg
                - (50) Count Titius Leopold of Habsburg (b. 2004), keeps his Austro-Hungarian dynastic rights.
          - Archduke George (1905–1952)
            - (51) Archduke Radbot (b. 1938); morganatically married to Caroline Proust, with issue.
            - (52) Archduke George (b. 1952).
      - Archduke Charles Salvator, Prince of Tuscany (1839–1892)
        - Archduke Leopold Salvator, Prince of Tuscany (1863–1931)
          - Archduke Antony (1901–1987)
            - (53) Archduke Dominic (b. 1937); married to Virginia Engel von Voss (divorced)
              - (54) Count Alexander of Habsburg (b. 1965), keeps his Austro-Hungarian dynastic rights.
                - (55) Count Constantine of Habsburg (b. 2000), keeps his Austro-Hungarian dynastic rights.
              - (56) Count Gregory of Habsburg (b. 1968), keeps his Austro-Hungarian dynastic rights.
        - Archduke Francis Salvator, Prince of Tuscany (1866–1939)
          - Archduke Hubert Salvator (1894–1971)
            - Archduke Frederick Salvator (1927–1999)
              - (57) Archduke Leopold (b. 1956)
              - (58) Archduke Alexander Salvator (b. 1959); married to Countess Mary Gabriella of Waldstein
                - (59) Archduke Constantine Salvator (b. 2002)
                - (60) Archduke Paul Salvator (b. 2003)
            - (61) Archduke Andrew Salvator (b. 1936); married to (1) [divorced 2001 (and annulled 2002)] Maria de la Piedad Espinosa de los Monteros y Rosillo (2) 2001 (civilly) and 2003 (religiously) Countess Valerie Podstatzky-Lichtenstein. Issue by the second marriage only.
              - (62) Archduke Thadeus Salvator (b. 2001)
              - (63) Archduke Casimir Salvator (b. 2003)
            - (64) Archduke Mark (b. 1946); married morganatically to Hildegard (Hilde) Maria Jungmayr, with issue.
            - (65) Archduke John (b. 1947); married morganatically to Anne-Marie Stummer, with issue.
            - (66) Archduke Michael (b. 1949); married in 1992 to Eva Antonia von Hofmann, with one daughter.
          - Archduke Theodore Salvator (1899–1978)
            - Archduke Charles Salvator (1936–2023); married to Baroness Edith Wenzl von Sternbach
              - Count Matthew of Habsburg (1971–2024), keeps his Austro-Hungarian dynastic rights; married to Eva Anderle
                - (67) Count Nicholas of Habsburg (b. 2000), keeps his Austro-Hungarian dynastic rights; married to Sandra Aschauer
                - (68) Count Jacob of Habsburg (b. 2001), keeps his Austro-Hungarian dynastic rights.
                - (69) Count Martin of Habsburg (b. 2011), keeps his Austro-Hungarian dynastic rights.
              - (70) Count John of Habsburg (b. 1974), keeps his Austro-Hungarian dynastic rights; married to Katharina Lieselotte Riedl Edle von Riedenstein
              - (71) Count Bernard of Habsburg (b. 1977), keeps his Austro-Hungarian dynastic rights.
              - (72) Count Benedict of Habsburg (b. 1983), keeps his Austro-Hungarian dynastic rights.
          - Archduke Clement Salvator (1904–1974); married to Countess Elisabeth Rességuier de Miremont [marriage retroactively approved as dynastic (only in Austria)]
            - Clement, Prince of Altenburg (1932–2022), retroactively integrated into the dynasty; married to Laurence Costa de Beauregard
              - (73) Philip, Prince of Altenburg (b. 1966), retroactively integrated into the dynasty.
            - (74) Prince George of Altenburg (b. 1933), retroactively integrated into the dynasty.
            - Prince Peter of Altenburg (1935–2008), retroactively integrated into the dynasty; married to Countess Juliana of Waldstein-Forni
              - (75) Prince Frederick of Altenburg (b. 1966), retroactively integrated into the dynasty; married to Countess Gabriella of Walterskirchen
                - (76) Prince Emmanuel of Altenburg (b.2002)
                - (77) Prince Nicholas of Altenburg (b. 2008)
              - (78) Prince Leopold of Altenburg (b. 1971), retroactively integrated into the dynasty.
            - (79) Prince John of Altenburg (b. 1949), retroactively integrated into the dynasty.
  - Archduke Joseph, Palatine of Hungary (1776–1847)
    - Archduke Joseph Charles (1833–1905)
      - Archduke Joseph Augustus (1872–1962)
        - Archduke Joseph Francis (1895–1957)
          - Archduke Joseph Árpád (1933–2017)
            - (80) Archduke Joseph Charles (b. 1960); married to Princess Margaret of Hohenberg
              - (81) Archduke Joseph Albert (b. 1994); married to Countess Sophia of Schaesberg
              - (82) Archduke Paul Leo (b. 1996)
            - (83) Archduke Andrew Agustin (b. 1963); married to Countess Mary Christina of Hatzfeldt-Dönhoff
              - (84) Archduke Frederick Cyprian (b. 1995)
              - (85) Archduke Peter (b. 1997)
              - (86) Archduke Benedict Alexander (b. 2005)
            - (87) Archduke Nicholas (b. 1973); married to Eugenia de Calonje y Gurrea
              - (88) Archduke Nicholas (b. 2003)
              - (89) Archduke James (b. 2006)
            - (90) Archduke John (b. 1975); married to María Gabriela Montenegro Villamizar
              - (91) Archduke John (b. 2010)
              - (92) Archduke Alexander (b. 2011)
              - (93) Archduke Ignatius (b. 2013)
          - (94) Archduke Géza (b. 1940); married morganatically twice to (1) [divorced] Monika Decker and (2) [civilly] Elizabeth Jane Kunstadter. Issue by both marriages.
          - (95) Archduke Michael (b. 1942); married to Princess Christiana of Löwenstein-Wertheim-Rosenberg, his brother's sister-in-law.
            - (96) Archduke Edward (b. 1967); married to Baroness Maria Theresia von Gudenus
              - (97) Archduke Paul Benedict (b. 2000)
            - (98) Father Paul von Habsburg-Lothringen (b. 1968), a priest of the Legion of Christ

== Tabular Family Tree ==
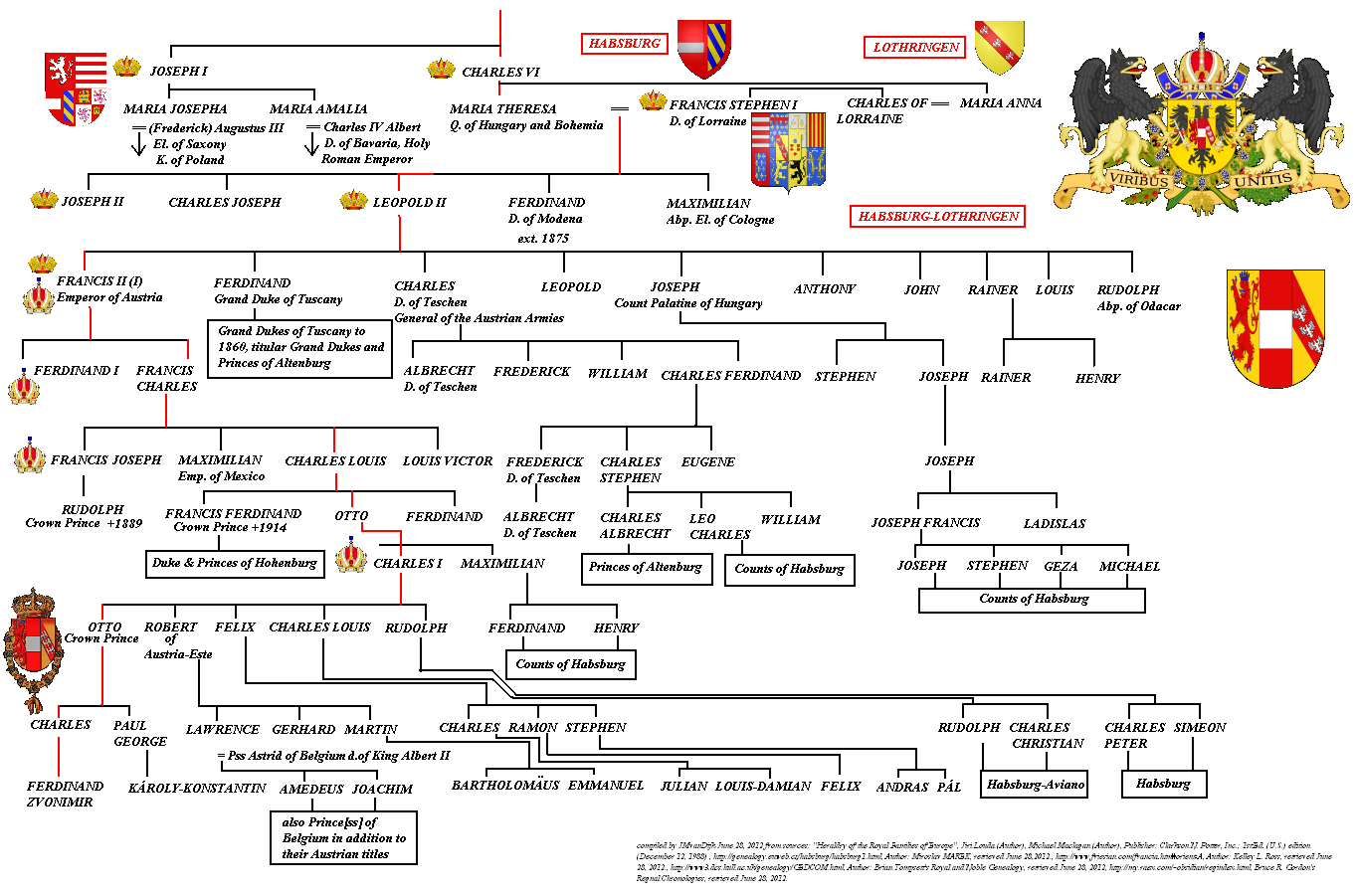
Habsburg-Lorraine Family Tree

Genealogy of the House of Habsburg-Lorraine

Name of Emperor –Holy Roman Emperor; Name of Emperor –Emperor of Austria;

Name of Duke –Duke of Lorraine

Name of Archduke –Archduke of Austria in the Imperial Line; Name of Archduke –Dukes of Teschen;

Name of Archduke –House of Habsburg-Hungary; Name of Archduke –House of Habsburg-Tuscany;

Name of Archduke –House of Austria-Este;

Every member of the house had the title of Archduke of Austria and prince royal of Hungary and Bohemia.

Leopold I (1640–1705); Holy Roman Emperor, 1658
Joseph I (1678–1711)); Holy Roman Emperor, 1705	Leopold (1679–1729); Duke of Lorraine & Bar, 1690–1729	Charles VI (1685–1740); Holy Roman Emperor, 1711; Archduke of Austria, King of Bohemia, King of Hungary, etc., 1711
Maria Josepha of Austria (1699–1757); Queen consort of Poland, Grand Duchess consort of Lithuania m. Augustus III, King of Poland, Grand Duke of Lithuania, Elector of Saxony	Maria Amalia (1701–1756); Holy Roman Empress, 1742-1745 m. Charles VII, Holy Roman Emperor, Elector of Bavaria (1697–1745)	Francis Stephen (1708–1765); Duke of Lorraine & Bar, 1729-37; Grand Duke of Tuscany, 1737; Holy Roman Emperor, 1745	Maria Theresa of Austria; 1717–1780); Queen of Bohemia and Hungary, Archduchess of Austria, 1743	Maria Anna (1718–1744) s. of Maria Theresa, gov. of the Austrian Netherlands	Charles Alexander Emmanuel (1712–1780), governor of the Austrian Netherlands and Austrian army commander.
House of Habsburg-Lorraine; Holy Roman Emperors, Archduke of Austria, King of Bohemia, King of Hungary, Emperor of Austria
Joseph II (1741–1790); Holy Roman Emperor, 1765; Archduke of Austria, King of Bohemia, King of Hungary, etc., 1765/sole 1780	Maria Christina, Duchess of Teschen (1742–1798); Gov. of the Netherlands m. Albert Casimir of Saxony, Duke of Teschen	Maria Elisabeth (1743–1808)	Charles Joseph (1745-17610	Maria Amalia (1746–1804) m. Ferdinand I of Parma	Leopold II (1747–1792); Grand Duke of Tuscany, 1765–1790; Holy Roman Emperor, 1765; Archduke of Austria, King of Bohemia, King of Hungary, etc., 1790	Maria Carolina (1752–1814) m. Ferdinand I of the Two Sicilies	Ferdinand Karl, Archduke of Austria-Este (1754–1806) tit. Duke of Modena; House of Austria-Este, ext. 1875 when inherited by 2nd House of Austria-Este	Maria Antonia/Marie Antionette (1755–1793); Queen of France m. Louis XVI of France	Maximilian Francis (1756–1801); Archbishop & Elector of Cologne, 1784
Francis II/I (1768–1835); Holy Roman Emperor, 1790-1806; Archduke of Austria, King of Bohemia, King of Hungary, etc., 1790; Emperor of Austria, 1804	Ferdinand III (1769–1824); Grand Duke of Tuscany,1790–1801 & 1814–1824	Charles (1771–1847); Duke of Teschen; Generalfeldmarschall & Commander-in-Chief of Austrian Armies	Leopold (1772–1795); Palatine of Hungary, 1790	John (1782–1859); Field Marshal; Imperial Regent, 1848-1849; Counts of Meran	Anton (1779–1835); Archbishop & Elector of Cologne, Prince-Bishop of Münster, 1801-3, Grand Master of the Teutonic Order, 1804	Joseph (1776–1847); Palatine of Hungary, 1795	Rainer (1783–1853); Austrian General; Viceroy of Kingdom of Lombardy–Venetia, 1818–1848	Louis (1784–1864); Feldmarschal-Leutnant	Rudolph (1788–1831); Archbishop of Olomouc, 1819–1831
Ferdinand I (1793 – 29 June 1875); Emperor of Austria, King of Bohemia, King of Hungary, etc., 1835-1848	Francis Charles (1802–1878)	Grand Dukes of Tuscany,to 1860, titl. & Princes of Altenburg	Albert (1817–1895); Duke of Teschen; Insp. Gen. & Generalfeldmarschall	1. Friedrich; (1821–1847) &: 2. William Francis; (1827–1894), Feldzeugmeister	Charles Ferdinand (1818–1874) Feldmarschallleut.	Stephen (1817–1867); Palatine of Hungary, 1847-48	Joseph Charles (1833–1905) titl. Palatine of Hungary, 1847-48; Feldmarschallleut.	Rainer (1827–1913); Feldmarschallleut. Minister-President of Austria,1861-65	1. Leopold (1823–1898), Oberkommandant der Marine, 1864–1868; 2. Henry (1828–1891); Feldmarschallleut.
Franz Joseph I (1830–1916); Emperor of Austria, King of Bohemia, King of Hungary, etc., 1848	Maximilian I of Mexico (1832 – ex. 1867); Emperor of Mexico, 1864-67	Charles Louis (1833–1896); Heir presumptive, 1889	Louis (1842–1919); Gen. der Waffengattung	Friedrich (1856–1936); Duke of Teschen; Generalfeldmarschall & Supreme Commander of the Imperial and Royal Armed Forces, 1914-16	Charles (1860–1933); Admiral, Austro-Hungarian Navy	Eugene (1863–1954); Generalfeldmarschall	Joseph August (1872–1962); Generalfeldmarschall; Head of State of Hungary, 1919
Rudolph (1858–1889); Crown Prince of Austria-Hungary	Archduke Franz Ferdinand of Austria-Este (1863 – assas. 1914); Heir presumptive, 1896; General der Waffengattung	Otto (1865–1906); Feldmarschallleut.	Ferdinand (1868–1915)	Albert (1897–1955); Duke of Teschen	Charles (1888–1951); Austro-Hungarian and Polish Army Colonel	Leo (1893–1939); Austro-Hungarian and Polish Army Officer	William (1895–1948); Austro-Hungarian and Ukrainian Army Officer	Joseph Francis (1895–1957); Austro-Hungarian Army Captain	Ladislaus Luitpold (1901–1946)
Princes and later Dukes of Hohenburg (non-dynastic)	Charles I (1887–1922); Emperor of Austria, King of Bohemia, King of Hungary, etc., 1916-1918	Maximilian (1895–1952); Major, Austro-Hungarian Army	Princes of Altenburg (non-dynastic)	Counts of Habsburg (non-dynastic)	Joseph Árpád (1932–2017)	1. István (Stephen) (1934–2011); 2. Géza (b. 1940); 3. Michael (b. 1942)
Dr. Otto (von) Habsburg(-Lothringen) (1912–2011); Crown Prince of Austria-Hungary, 1916-1918	Robert, Archduke of Austria-Este (1915–1996); Archduke of Austria-Este, 1917	Felix (1916–2011); Sons: 1. Carlos Felipe (1954–); 2. Raimund (Ramón) (1958–2008)	Carl Ludwig (1918–2007); Sons: 1. Rudolf (b. 1950); 2. Carl Christian (b. 1954); 3. István (Esteban) (b. 1961); Habsburg-Aviano	Rudolf (1919–2010); Sons 1. Karl Peter (b. 1955); 2. Simeon Habsburg-Lothringen (b. 1958); Counts of Habsburg	Ferdinand (1918–2004); Counts of Habsburg	Heinrich (1925–2014); Counts of Habsburg	Counts of Habsburg (non-dynastic)
Karl (von) Habsburg-Lothringen (1961–)	Georg (von) Habsburg-Lothringen (1964–)	Lorenz of Austria-Este (1955–); Prince of Belgium, 1995 m. Princess Astrid of Belgium	Gerhard (1957–)	Martin (1959–)
Ferdinand Habsburg(-Lothringen) (1997–); Austrian motor racing driver	Karoly-Konstantin (b. 2004)	Amedeo of Austria-Este and Belgium (b. 1986) m. Elisabetta Maria Rosboch von Wolkenstein	Joachim of Austria-Este and Belgium (b. 1991)

== Heraldry ==
Arms of Archdukes & Archduchesses before 11 February 1896.	Arms of Archdukes & Archduchesses after 11 February 1896.	Arms of Archdukes & Archduchesses of the Tuscan branch.

== See also ==
- House of Habsburg
- House of Lorraine

== Sources ==
- C. A. Macartney, The Habsburg Empire, 1790–1918, Faber & Faber, 2014, 900 pages. ISBN 0571306292
- Jean Bérenger, Histoire de l'empire des Habsbourg, 1273–1918, Fayard, 1990, 810 pages. ISBN 978-2-213-02297-0
- Hans Bankl, Mal d'Asburgo. Vizi, vezzi, malanni e manie della Casa Imperiale d'Austria , traduzione di Flavia Foradini, Trieste, mgs press, 1998, pp. 202
- Flavia Foradini, "Otto d'Asburgo. L'ultimo atto di una dinastia", mgs press, Trieste, 2004. ISBN 88-89219-04-1
- Martha e Horst Schad, La prediletta. Il diario della figlia di Sissi, traduzione di Flavia Foradini, Trieste, mgs Press 2001, ISBN 88-86424-78-7
- Sigrid-Maria Größing, Rodolfo d'Asburgo. Libero pensatore, rubacuori, psicopatico, traduzione di Flavia Foradini, Trieste, mgs Press 2006, ISBN 88-89219-17-3
