= Battle of Solferino order of battle =

The following is a complete list of units and commanders who fought in the battle of Solferino on June 24, 1859.

== French Army ==
Emperor Napoleon III
Chief of Staff: Jean-Baptiste Philibert Vaillant

=== Imperial Guard ===
Auguste Regnaud de Saint-Jean d'Angély

Division	Brigade	Regiments and Others
First Division; François Aimé Mellinet	1st Brigade Niol	2 battalions of Zouaves; 3 battalions of 1st Grenadiers
First Division; François Aimé Mellinet	2nd Brigade Blanchard	3 battalions of 2nd Grenadiers; 3 battalions of 3rd Grenadiers
First Division; François Aimé Mellinet	Artillery	12 guns
Second Division; Jacques Camou	1st Brigade Manéque	1 battalion of Chasseurs; 3 battalions of 1st Voltigeurs; 3 battalions of 2nd Voltigeurs
Second Division; Jacques Camou	2nd Brigade Picard	3 battalions of 3rd Voltigeurs; 3 battalions of 4th Voltigeurs
Second Division; Jacques Camou	Artillery	12 guns
Cavalry; Louis Morris	1st Brigade Marion	4 squadrons of 1st Cuirassiers; 4 squadrons of 2nd Cuirassiers
Cavalry; Louis Morris	2nd Brigade de Champeron	4 squadrons of Dragoons; 4 squadrons of Lancers
Cavalry; Louis Morris	3rd Brigade Cassaignolles	4 squadrons of Chasseurs à Cheval; 4 squadrons of Guides
Cavalry; Louis Morris	Artillery	12 guns

=== I Corps ===
Achille Baraguey d'Hilliers

Division	Brigade	Regiments and Others
3rd Division; François Achille Bazaine	1st Brigade Goze	3 battalions of 1st Zouaves; 3 battalions of 33rd Regiment; 3 battalions of 34th Regiment
3rd Division; François Achille Bazaine	2nd Brigade Dumont	3 battalions of 37th Regiment; 3 battalions of 78th Regiment
3rd Division; François Achille Bazaine	Artillery	12 guns
Cavalry Division; Desvaux	1st Brigade de Planhol	4 squadrons of 5th Hussars; 4 squadrons of 1st Chasseurs d'Afrique
Cavalry Division; Desvaux	2nd Brigade de Forton	4 squadrons of 2nd Chasseurs d'Afrique; 4 squadrons of 3rd Chasseurs d'Afrique
Cavalry Division; Desvaux	Artillery	6 guns

=== II Corps ===
Patrice de MacMahon

Division	Brigade	Regiments and Others
First Division; La Motterouge	1st Brigade Lefebvre	3 battalions of Turcos; 3 battalions of 45th Regiment
First Division; La Motterouge	2nd Brigade Douay	3 battalions of 65th Regiment; 3 battalions of 70th Regiment
First Division; La Motterouge	Artillery	12 guns
Second Division; Claude Théodore Decaen	1st Brigade Gault	1 battalion of 11th Chasseurs; 3 battalions of 71st Regiment; 3 battalions of 72nd Regiment
Second Division; Claude Théodore Decaen	2nd Brigade de Castagny	3 battalions of 2nd Zouaves; 2 battalions of 1st Foreign Legion; 3 battalions of 2nd Foreign Legion
Second Division; Claude Théodore Decaen	Artillery	12 guns
Cavalry	Cavalry Brigade Gaudin de Villaine	4 squadrons of 4th Chasseurs à Cheval; 4 squadrons of 7th Chasseurs à Cheval

=== III Corps ===
François Certain Canrobert

Division	Brigade	Regiments and Others
First Division; Renault	1st Brigade Döens	1 battalion of 8th Chasseurs; 3 battalions of 23rd Regiment; 3 battalions of 90th Regiment
First Division; Renault	2nd Brigade Jannin	3 battalions of 41st Regiment; 3 battalions of 56th Regiment
First Division; Renault	Artillery	12 guns
Second Division; Jules Trochu	1st Brigade Bataille	1 battalion of 19th Chasseurs; 3 battalions of 43rd Regiment; 3 battalions of 44th Regiment
Second Division; Jules Trochu	2nd Brigade Collineau	3 battalions of 64th Regiment; 3 battalions of 88th Regiment
Second Division; Jules Trochu	Artillery	12 guns
3rd Division; Charles Denis Bourbaki	1st Brigade Vergé	1 battalion of 18th Chasseurs; 3 battalions of 11th Regiment; 3 battalions of 14th Regiment
3rd Division; Charles Denis Bourbaki	2nd Brigade Auguste-Alexandre Ducrot	3 battalions of 46th Regiment; 3 battalions of 59th Regiment
3rd Division; Charles Denis Bourbaki	Artillery	12 guns
Cavalry Division; Partouneaux	1st Brigade de Clérembault	4 squadrons of 2nd Hussars; 4 squadrons of 7th Hussars
Cavalry Division; Partouneaux	2nd Brigade de Labareyre	4 squadrons of 1st Lancers; 4 squadrons of 4th Lancers
Cavalry Division; Partouneaux	Artillery	6 guns

=== IV Corps ===
Adolphe Niel

Division	Brigade	Regiments and Others
First Division de Luzy	1st Brigade C. Douay	1 battalion of 5th Chasseurs; 3 battalions of 30th Regiment; 3 battalions of 49th Regiment
First Division de Luzy	2nd Brigade Lenoble	3 battalions of 6th Regiment; 3 battalions of 8th Regiment
First Division de Luzy	Artillery	12 guns
Second Division; Joseph Vinoy	1st Brigade de Capriol	1 battalion of 6th Chasseurs; 3 battalions of 52nd Regiment; 3 battalions of 73rd Regiment
Second Division; Joseph Vinoy	2nd Brigade de la Charriére	3 battalions of 85th Regiment; 3 battalions of 86th Regiment
Second Division; Joseph Vinoy	Artillery	12 guns
3rd Division; Pierre Louis Charles de Failly	1st Brigade O'Farrell	1 battalion of 15th Chasseurs; 3 battalions of 2nd Regiment; 3 battalions of 53rd Regiment
3rd Division; Pierre Louis Charles de Failly	2nd Brigade Saurin	3 battalions of 55th Regiment; 3 battalions of 76th Regiment
3rd Division; Pierre Louis Charles de Failly	Artillery	12 guns
Cavalry	Cavalry Brigade de Rochefort	4 squadrons of 2nd Chasseurs à Cheval; 4 squadrons of 10th Chasseurs à Cheval

== Piedmont-Sardinian Army ==
King Victor Emmanuel II
Minister of War: Alfonso Ferrero La Marmora

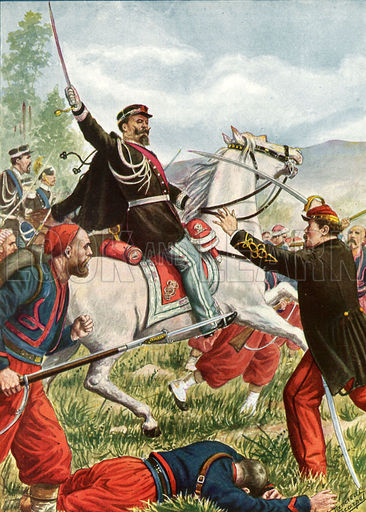
Victor Emanuel at the battle of Solferino

Division	Brigade	Units
1st Division; Lieutenant General Giovanni Durando	Brigade "Granatieri di Sardegna"; General Scozia di Calliano	1st Grenadiers Regiment — 4× battalions; 2nd Grenadiers Regiment — 4× battalions; III Bersaglieri Battalion
1st Division; Lieutenant General Giovanni Durando	Brigade "Savoia"; General Perrier	1st Infantry Regiment — 4× battalions; 2nd Infantry Regiment — 4× battalions; IV Bersaglieri Battalion
1st Division; Lieutenant General Giovanni Durando		Regiment "Cavalleggeri di Alessandria" — 4× squadrons
1st Division; Lieutenant General Giovanni Durando		Field Artillery Regiment — 3× batteries with 18× guns
2nd Division; Lieutenant General Manfredo Fanti	Brigade "Piemonte"; General Camerana	3rd Infantry Regiment — 4× battalions; 4th Infantry Regiment — 4× battalions; IX Bersaglieri Battalion
2nd Division; Lieutenant General Manfredo Fanti	Brigade "Aosta"; General Cerale	5th Infantry Regiment — 4× battalions; 6th Infantry Regiment — 4× battalions; I Bersaglieri Battalion
2nd Division; Lieutenant General Manfredo Fanti		Regiment "Cavalleggeri di Aosta" — 4× squadrons
2nd Division; Lieutenant General Manfredo Fanti		Field Artillery Regiment — 3× batteries with 18× guns
3rd Division; Lieutenant General Philibert Mollard	Brigade "Cuneo"; General Araldi	7th Infantry Regiment — 4× battalions; 8th Infantry Regiment — 4× battalions; X Bersaglieri Battalion
3rd Division; Lieutenant General Philibert Mollard	Brigade "Pinerolo"; General Morozzo della Rocca	13th Infantry Regiment — 4× battalions; 14th Infantry Regiment — 4× battalions; II Bersaglieri Battalion
3rd Division; Lieutenant General Philibert Mollard		Regiment "Cavalleggeri di Monferrato" — 4× squadrons
3rd Division; Lieutenant General Philibert Mollard		Field Artillery Regiment — 3× batteries with 18× guns
4th Division; Lieutenant General Enrico Cialdini	Brigade "Regina"; General Villamarina	9th Infantry Regiment — 4× battalions; 10th Infantry Regiment — 4× battalions; VII Bersaglieri Battalion
4th Division; Lieutenant General Enrico Cialdini	Brigade "Savona"; General Broglia	15th Infantry Regiment — 4× battalions; 16th Infantry Regiment — 4× battalions; VI Bersaglieri Battalion
4th Division; Lieutenant General Enrico Cialdini		Regiment "Cavalleggeri di Novara" — 4× squadrons
4th Division; Lieutenant General Enrico Cialdini		Field Artillery Regiment — 3× batteries with 18× guns
5th Division; Lieutenant General Gucchiari	Brigade "Casale"; General Pettinengo	11th Infantry Regiment — 4× battalions; 12th Infantry Regiment — 4× battalions; VIII Bersaglieri Battalion
5th Division; Lieutenant General Gucchiari	Brigade "Acqui"; General Gozzani di Treville	17th Infantry Regiment — 4× battalions; 18th Infantry Regiment — 4× battalions; V Bersaglieri Battalion
5th Division; Lieutenant General Gucchiari		Regiment "Cavalleggeri di Saluzzo" — 4× squadrons
5th Division; Lieutenant General Gucchiari		Field Artillery Regiment — 3× batteries with 18× guns
Cavalry Division; General Bertone di Sambuy	1st Brigade; General Sonnaz	Regiment "Nizza Cavalleria" — 4× squadrons; Regiment "Piemonte Reale Cavalleria" — 4× squadrons
Cavalry Division; General Bertone di Sambuy	2nd Brigade; General Savoiroux	Regiment "Savoia Cavalleria" — 4× squadrons; Regiment "Genova Cavalleria" — 4× squadrons
Cavalry Division; General Bertone di Sambuy		Field Artillery Regiment — 2× horse batteries with 12× guns

== Austrian Army ==
Emperor Franz Joseph
Adjutant General: Karl Ludwig von Grünne
Quartermaster General: Heinrich von Heß

=== First Army ===
Franz Graf von Wimpffen

==== II Corps ====
Prince Eduard Franz of Liechtenstein

Division	Brigade	Regiments and Others
First Division; Jellacic	1st Brigade Szabo	1 battalion of 9th Grenz Regiment; 4 battalions of 12th Regiment
First Division; Jellacic	2nd Brigade Wachter	1 battalion of 10th Grenz Regiment; 4 battalions of 46th Regiment
First Division; Jellacic	Artillery	16 guns
Second Division; Herdy	1st Brigade Kintzl	4 battalions of 45th Regiment
Second Division; Herdy	2nd Brigade Hahn	2 battalions of 21st Regiment; 1 battalion of 31st Regiment; 1 battalion of 32nd Regiment; 1 battalion of 39th Regiment; 1 battalion of 47th Regiment; 1 battalion of 54th Regiment
Second Division; Herdy	Artillery	8 guns
Second Division; Herdy	Mantua garrison	1/2 battalion of 1st Regiment; 1 battalion of 33rd Regiment; 1 battalion of 49th Regiment
Second Division; Herdy	Cavalry	4 squadrons of 12th Hussars

==== III Corps ====
Edmund Prince of Schwarzenberg

Division	Brigade	Regiments and Others
First Division; Schönberger	1st Brigade Pokorny	1 battalion of 15th Jägers; 4 battalions of 58th Regiment
First Division; Schönberger	2nd Brigade Dienstel	1 battalion of 13th Jägers; 4 battalions of 27th Regiment
First Division; Schönberger	Artillery	16 guns
Second Division; Habermann	1st Brigade Wetzlar	1 battalion of 2nd Grenz Regiment; 4 battalions of 5th Regiment
Second Division; Habermann	2nd Brigade Ernst Ritter von Hartung	1 battalion of 23rd Jägers; 4 battalions of 14th Regiment
Second Division; Habermann	Artillery	24 guns
Second Division; Habermann	Cavalry	4 squadrons of 10th Hussars

==== IX Corps ====
Schaffgotsche

Division	Brigade	Regiments and Others
First Division	1st Brigade Castiglione	1 battalion of 8th Grenz Regiment; 4 battalions of 19th Regiment
First Division	2nd Brigade Wimpffen	1 battalion of 8th Grenz Regiment; 4 battalions of 40th Regiment
First Division	3rd Brigade Suini	1 battalion of 16th Jägers; 4 battalions of 34th Regiment
First Division	Artillery	24 guns
Second Division; Grenneville	1st Brigade Blumencron	1 battalion of 4th Jägers; 4 battalions of 52nd Regiment
Second Division; Grenneville	2nd Brigade Fehimayr	1 battalion of Titler Grenz Regiment; 4 battalions of 8th Regiment
Second Division; Grenneville	Artillery	16 guns
Cavalry	Cavalry Brigade	4 squadrons of 12th Uhlans

==== X Corps ====
Wernhardt

Division	Brigade	Regiments and Others
First Division; Marziani	1st Brigade Joseph Freiherr von Maroicic	1 battalion of 12th Jägers; 4 battalions of 15th Regiment
First Division; Marziani	2nd Brigade Anthione	1 battalion of 14th Grenz Regiment; 4 battalions of 15th Regiment
First Division; Marziani	3rd Brigade Jablonsky	1 battalion of 20th Jägers; 4 battalions of 33rd Regiment
First Division; Marziani	Artillery	24 guns
Second Division; Wallemare	1st Brigade Schiller	1 battalion of 5th Jägers; 4 battalions of 6th Regiment
Second Division; Wallemare	2nd Brigade Mollinary	1 battalion of 13th Grenz Regiment; 4 battalions of 56th Regiment
Second Division; Wallemare	Artillery	16 guns
Cavalry	Cavalry Brigade	4 squadrons of 4th Uhlans

==== XI Corps ====
Weigl

Division	Brigade	Regiments and Others
First Division; Schwartzel	1st Brigade Sebottendorf	1 battalion of 10th Jägers; 4 battalions of 37th Regiment
First Division; Schwartzel	2nd Brigade Greschke	4 battalions of 35th Regiment
First Division; Schwartzel	Artillery	16 guns
Second Division; Blomberg	1st Brigade Baltin	1 battalion of 5th Grenz Regiment; 4 battalions of 9th Regiment
Second Division; Blomberg	2nd Brigade Dobrzensky	1 battalion of 21st Jägers; 4 battalions of 42nd Regiment
Second Division; Blomberg	3rd Brigade Host	1 battalion of 9th Grenz Regiment; 4 battalions of 57th Regiment
Second Division; Blomberg	Artillery	24 guns
Cavalry	Cavalry Brigade	4 squadrons of 4th Uhlans

=== Second Army ===
Franz Schlik

==== I Corps ====
Eduard Clam-Gallas

Division	Brigade	Regiments and Others
First Division; Montenuovo	1st Brigade Paszthory	1 battalion of 2nd Jägers; 4 battalions of 60th Regiment
First Division; Montenuovo	2nd Brigade Brunner	1 battalion of 11th Grenz Regiment; 4 battalions of 29th Regiment
First Division; Montenuovo	Artillery	16 guns
Second Division; Stankovics	1st Brigade Hoditz	1 battalion of 14th Jägers; 4 battalions of 48th Regiment
Second Division; Stankovics	2nd Brigade Reznicek	1 battalion of 24th Jägers; 4 battalions of 16th Regiment
Second Division; Stankovics	Artillery	16 guns
Cavalry	Cavalry Brigade	4 squadrons of 12th Hussars

==== V Corps ====
Philipp von Stadion und Thannhausen

Division	Brigade	Regiments and Others
First Division; Palffy	1st Brigade Gaal	1 battalion of 1st Grenz Regiment; 4 battalions of 3rd Regiment
First Division; Palffy	2nd Brigade Puchner	1 battalion of 4th Jägers; 4 battalions of 31st Regiment
First Division; Palffy	3rd Brigade Bils	1 battalion of 3rd Grenz Regiment; 4 battalions of 47th Regiment
First Division; Palffy	Artillery	24 guns
Second Division; Sternberg	1st Brigade Koller	1 battalion of 3rd Grenz Regiment; 4 battalions of 32nd Regiment
Second Division; Sternberg	2nd Brigade Festetics	1 battalion of 6th Jägers; 4 battalions of 21st Regiment
Second Division; Sternberg	Artillery	16 guns
Cavalry	Cavalry Brigade	4 squadrons of 12th Uhlans

==== VII Corps ====
Friedrich Zobel

Division	Brigade	Regiments and Others
First Division; Hess	1st Brigade Wussin	1 battalion of 1st Grenz Regiment; 4 battalions of 1st Regiment
First Division; Hess	2nd Brigade Ludwig von Gablenz	1 battalion of 4th Grenz Regiment; 4 battalions of 4th Regiment
First Division; Hess	Artillery	16 guns
Second Division; Lilia	1st Brigade Brandenstein	1 battalion of 19th Jägers; 4 battalions of 53rd Regiment
Second Division; Lilia	2nd Brigade Wallon	1 battalion of 2nd Grenz Regiment; 4 battalions of 17th Regiment
Second Division; Lilia	Artillery	16 guns
Cavalry	Cavalry Brigade	4 squadrons of 1st Hussars

==== VIII Corps ====
Ludwig von Benedek

Division	Brigade	Regiments and Others
First Division; Berger	1st Brigade Watervliet	1 battalion of 2nd Jägers; 4 battalions of 7th Regiment
First Division; Berger	2nd Brigade Kuhn	1 battalion of 4th Grenz Regiment; 4 battalions of 17th Regiment
First Division; Berger	Artillery	16 guns
Second Division; Lang	1st Brigade Phillippovic	1 battalion of 5th Jägers; 4 battalions of 11th Regiment
Second Division; Lang	2nd Brigade Dauber	1 battalion of 3rd Jägers; 4 battalions of 39th Regiment
Second Division; Lang	3rd Brigade Lippert	1 battalion of 9th Jägers; 4 battalions of 59th Regiment
Second Division; Lang	Artillery	24 guns
Cavalry Division; Mensdorff	1st Brigade Holstein	6 squadrons of 5th Dragoons; 6 squadrons of 6th Dragoos
Cavalry Division; Mensdorff	2nd Brigade Zichy	8 squadrons of 1st Uhlans
Cavalry Division; Mensdorff	Artillery	16 guns

== See also ==
- List of orders of battle
