= Cvjetićanin =

Cvjetićanin (Serbian Cyrillic: Цвјетићанин) is a Serbian surname, a toponymic derived from several placenames, such as Veliki Cvjetnić. It may refer to:

- Danko Cvjetićanin (born 1963), Yugoslav basketball player
- Emanuel Cvjetićanin (1833–1919), Austro-Hungarian commander
- Bojan Cvjetićanin, singer of Slovenian shagadelic band Joker Out
