= List of Military Order of Maria Theresa recipients of Croatian descent =

This is a list of the Military Order of Maria Theresa (German: Militär-Maria-Theresien-Orden, Croatian: Vojni Red Marije Terezije) recipients of Croatian origin in alphabetical order:

#	Image	Name	Born/died	Grade/class	Notes
1.	Svetozar Borojević	Svetozar Borojević	1856–1920	Commander's Cross	promoted in 1917 as colonel general
2.	Adam Franjo Burić	Adam Franjo Burić	1732–1803	Knight's Cross	promoted in 1779 as major, later was lieutenant colonel
3.	Ivan Vilim Burić	Ivan Vilim Burić	1792–1858	Knight's Cross	Adam Franjo's son, promoted in 1850 as lieutenant field marshal
4.	Aleksandar Franjo Čorić	Aleksandar Franjo Čorić	1772–1847	Knight's Cross	promoted in 1802 as captain, later was lieutenant field marshal
5.	Antun Čorić	Antun Čorić	1795–1864	Knight's Cross	Aleksandar Franjo's nephew, promoted in 1850 as lieutenant field marshal, later was feldzeugmeister (general of the artillery) and Habsburg Monarchy minister of war
6.	Đuro Dragičević	Đuro Dragičević	1890–1980	Knight's Cross	promoted in 1921 as oberleutnant for his personal venture in World War I, later was general
7.	Josip Kazimir Drašković	Josip Kazimir Drašković	1716–1765	Knight's Cross, Commander's Cross	received the Knight's Cross in 1758 as lieutenant field marshal and the Commander's Cross in 1765 as feldzeugmeister (general of the artillery)
8.	Petar Duka	Petar Duka	1756–1822	Knight's Cross	born in Osijek in an ethnic Aromanian family, promoted in 1794 as lieutenant colonel, later was feldzeugmeister
9.	Josip Filipović	Josip Filipović	1819–1889	Commander's Cross	promoted in 1879 as feldzeugmeister
10.	Karlo Pavao Gvozdanović	Karlo Pavao Gvozdanović	1763–1817	Knight's Cross, Commander's Cross	received the Knight's Cross as major in 1801 and the Commander's; Cross as major general in 1814
11.	Petar Vid Gvozdanović	Petar Vid Gvozdanović	1738–1802	Knight's Cross, Commander's Cross	received the Knight's Cross as colonel in 1779 and the Commander's; Cross as feldzeugmeister in 1795
12.		Ivan Iskrić	1884–1961	Knight's Cross	promoted in 1921 as captain, later was colonel
13.	Šimun Ivičić	Šimun Ivičić	1759–1823	Knight's Cross	promoted in 1796 as captain, retired in 1801 as major
14.	Franjo Jelačić	Franjo Jelačić	1746–1810	Knight's Cross	promoted in 1799 as major general
15.	Josip Jelačić	Josip Jelačić	1801–1859	Commander's Cross	Franjo's son, promoted in 1849 as lieutenant field marshal
16.	Stjepan Jovanović	Stjepan Jovanović	1828–1885	Knight's Cross	born in Lika, promoted in 1879 as lieutenant field marshal
17.	Martin Knežević	Martin Knežević	1708–1781	Knight's Cross	promoted in 1762 as colonel, later was major general
18.	Vinko Knežević	Vinko Knežević	1755–1832	Knight's Cross	Martin's son, promoted in 1799 as colonel, later was general of the Cavalry
19.	Vladimir Laxa	Vladimir Laxa	1870–1945	Knight's Cross	born in Sisak, promoted in 1917 as colonel, later was general
20.	Geza Lukačić	Geza Lukačić	1865–1943	Knight's Cross	born in Košice, Slovakia, promoted in 1917 as major general, later was lieutenant field marshal
21.	Lazar Mamula	Lazar Mamula	1795–1878	Knight's Cross	promoted in 1849 as colonel, later was feldzeugmeister
22.	Ivan Marojević	Ivan Marojević	1772–1831	Knight's Cross	received the Knight's Cross at 87th promotion in 1811 as captain, later was colonel
23.	Josip Maroičić	Josip Maroičić	1812–1882	Knight's Cross, Commander's Cross	received the Knight's Cross in 1849 as major and the Commander's; Cross in 1866 as lieutenant field marshal, later was feldzeugmeister
24.	Daniel Peharnik-Hotković	Daniel Peharnik-Hotković	1745–1794	Knight's Cross	promoted in 1790 as major general
25.	Antun Pejačević	Antun Pejačević	1749–1802	Knight's Cross	promoted in 1790 as colonel, later was lieutenant field marshal
26.	Gabrijel Rodić	Gabrijel Rodić	1812–1890	Knight's Cross	promoted in 1866 as major general, later was feldzeugmeister
27.	Juraj Rukavina Vidovgradski	Juraj Rukavina Vidovgradski	1777–1849	Knight's Cross	promoted in 1849 as lieutenant field marshal, later was feldzeugmeister
28.	Matija Rukavina Bojnogradski	Matija Rukavina Bojnogradski	1737–1817	Knight's Cross	promoted in 1796 as major general, later was lieutenant field marshal
29.	Baltazar Šimunić	Baltazar Šimunić	1785–1861	Knight's Cross	received the Knight's Cross in 1849 as lieutenant field marshal, became baron in 1850.
30.	Josip Šišković	Josip Šišković	1719–1783	Knight's Cross, Commander's Cross	born in Szeged, southern Hungary, to an ethnic Croat (Bunjevci) family, received the Knight's; Cross in 1758 as colonel and the Commander's Cross in 1765 as lieutenant fieldmarshal
31.	Franjo Ksaver Tomašić	Franjo Ksaver Tomašić	1761–1831	Knight's Cross, Commander's Cross	received the Knight's Cross in 1802 as major and the Commander's; Cross in 1813 as major general, later was lieutenant fieldmarshal
32.	Đuro Unukić	Đuro Unukić	1814–1867	Knight's Cross	born in Lipovac, Slavonian Military; Frontier, promoted in 1850 as captain, later was lieutenant colonel
33.	Josip Filip Vukasović	Josip Filip Vukasović	1755–1809	Knight's Cross	promoted in 1788 as major, later was lieutenant field marshal

== See also ==
- Habsburg monarchy
- Orders, decorations, and medals of Austria-Hungary
- Orders, decorations, and medals of Croatia
- List of Croatian soldiers
- List of honours of Croatia awarded to heads of state and royals
