= Gvozdanović =

Gvozdanović is a surname. Notable people with the surname include:

- Petar Vid Gvozdanović (1738–1802), Croatian Habsburg general and nobleman
- Karlo Pavao Gvozdanović (1763–1817), Croatian Habsburg general and nobleman
- Anka Gvozdanović (1887–1968), Croatian philanthropist

== See also ==
- Gvozdenović
