= Janez Modic =

Janez Modic (5 April 1846 – after 1892) was a Carniolan apiarist, bee merchant, and editor. He played a significant role in laying the foundations of organized apiculture in Slovenia.

== Biography ==
Janez Modic was born in Dvorska Vas. As a young man, he served in the Austro-Hungarian military, attaining the rank of sergeant. He took part in the Battle of Custoza in 1866.

After his military service, he was active in industry, initially in Bohinjska Bistrica. He moved to Jesenice by 1879, where he was involved in the bee trade. Modic distributed colonies of bees in hives, swarms, and queen bees, and also employed a beekeeper. In addition to his involvement in apiculture, he also prospected for ore deposits and was a hunter. Modic founded the Jesenice-based Carniolan Beekeepers and Orchardists Society (Slovene: Čebelarsko in sadjarsko društvo za Kranjsko) on 20 May 1883 as a counterweight to the Vienna-based beekeeping association and he served as its president. He published the Ljubljana-based newsletter Slovenski čebelar in sadjerejec (The Slovenian Beekeeper and Orchardist) from 1883 to 1889.

In the late 1880s, Modic's business activities went into decline. After the society ceased operating in 1889, Modic left his house and property in Sava and moved away to Carinthia, Austria. His date and place of death are unknown, but he died after 1892.
