= Georg Dragičević =

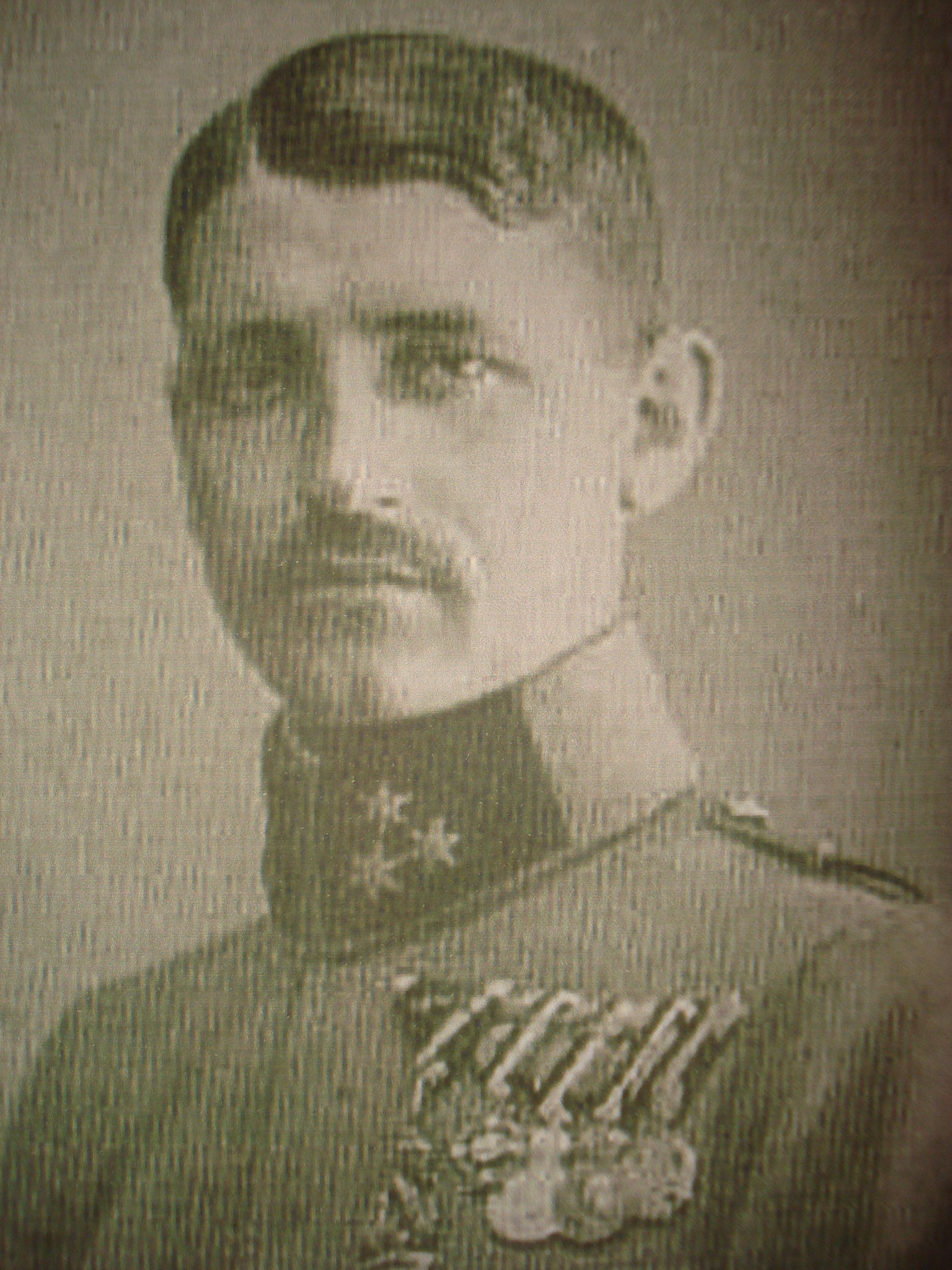
Đuro Dragičević (George Dragichevich)

Grave of Georg Dragičević at the Theresian Military Academy Cemetery (2022)

Georg Dragičević (born Đuro Dragičević; 7 November 1890 in Kalesija – 28 July 1980 in Vienna) was a Croatian soldier who was a member of the army of Austria-Hungary, Royal Yugoslavia, and the Independent State of Croatia.

He attended the Imperial and Royal Technical Military Academy at Mödling near Vienna and graduated from there as a Leutnant on 18 August 1911 with an assignment to Festungsartillerieregiment Kaiser Nr.1 (Fortress Artillery), then based in Vienna. At an early age, he joined the Imperial Army, and later served the empire in the First World War in Poland. During the war, on mobilisation in August 1914, he was promoted to Oberleutnant and given command of a battery in the 106th Field Artillery Brigade equipped with obsolete 9-centimetre field guns. For his service in the war, he was rewarded the Military Order of Maria Theresa.

After the war, the empire collapsed and Dragičević travelled to the newly formed Kingdom of Serbs, Croats and Slovenes in his homeland and joined the Royal Yugoslav Army. Within the Yugoslavian army, he became second-in-command of the anti-aircraft unit.

During World War II, Dragičević first served as the head of the Army Artillery service of the Croatian Armed Forces of the newly formed Fascist Independent State of Croatia. He was later assigned to the Croatian embassy in Berlin where he was in charge of weapons procurement for the nation. He survived the Battle of Berlin, but was later captured by the Red Army. Dragičević was held in prison camps for nine years, until 1954, when he moved to Austria.

He was awarded the Order of the Iron Crown Third Class with War Decoration and Swords, the Military Merit Cross Third Class with War Decoration and Swords, both the Silver (with Swords) and Bronze Military Merit Medals (Signum Laudis) and the Karl Troop Cross.

== See also ==
- List of Military Order of Maria Theresa recipients of Croatian descent
- List of Croatian soldiers
