= Karl Paul von Quosdanovich =

Croatian nobleman and general (1763–1817)

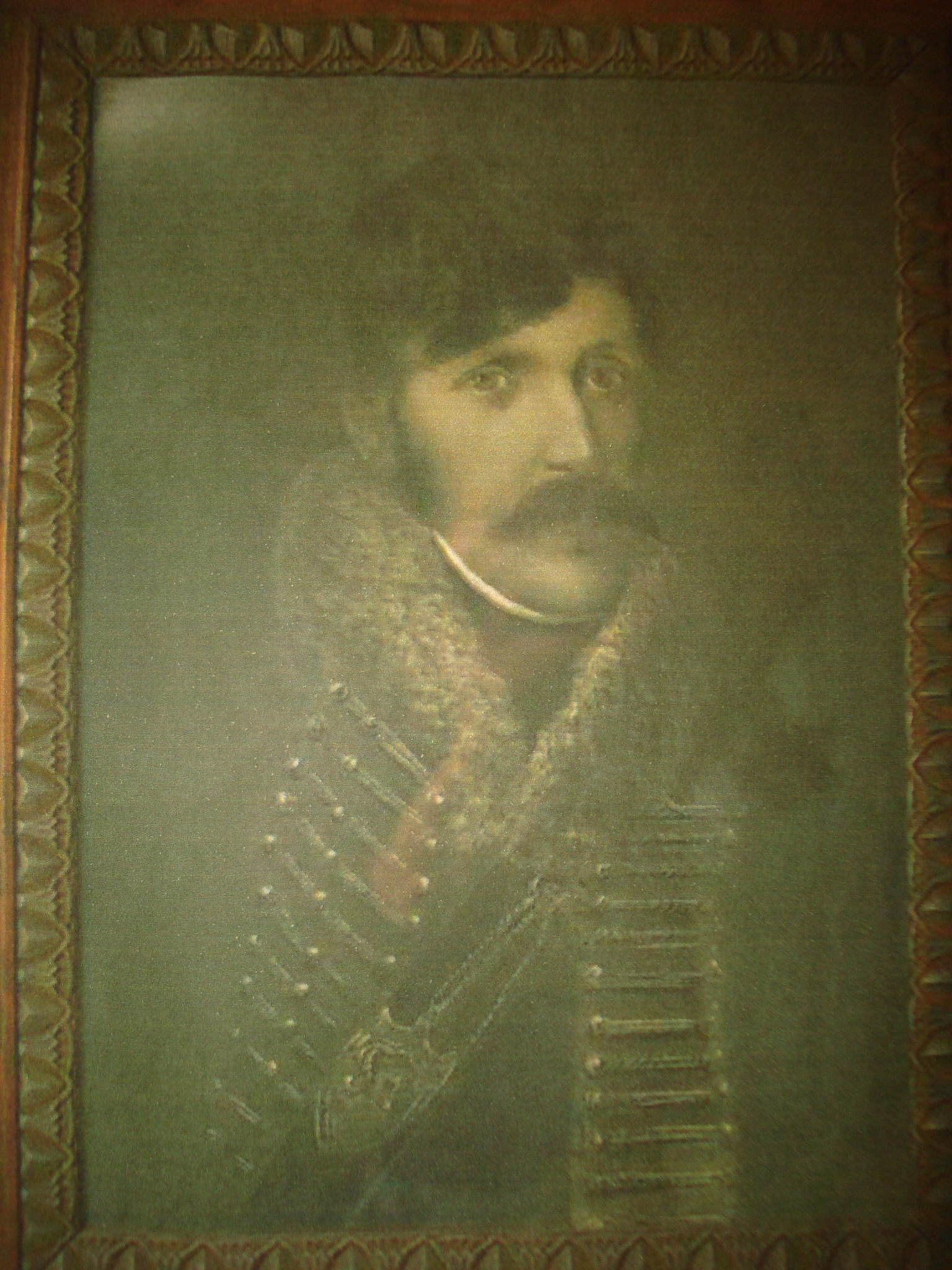
- Baron Karl Paul von Quosdanovich
- Native name: Karlo Pavao Gvozdanović
- Born: 1763; Brezovac Žumberački, a village near Samobor, Kingdom of Croatia within Habsburg Monarchy
- Died: 5 February 1817 (aged 53–54) Pančevo, Banat Military Frontier, Habsburg monarchy
- Allegiance: (Habsburg monarchy) Habsburg Austria
- Branch: Army
- Service years: ?–1817
- Rank: Major general
- Conflicts: Battle of Eckmühl (1809), Battle of the Mincio River (1814), etc.: Austro–Turkish War (1787–1791); French Revolutionary Wars; Napoleonic Wars
- Awards: Military Order of Maria Theresa, Knight (1801) and Commander (1814)

Karl Paul von Quosdanovich (Croatian: Karlo Pavao Gvozdanović, in some sources also Quasdanovich or Guosdanovich; 1763 – 5 February 1817) was a Croatian nobleman and general in the Habsburg monarchy imperial army service. He was a Habsburg nobleman and general. He achieved the rank of major general and was awarded the Knight's Cross of the Military Order of Maria Theresa in 1801 and the Commander's Cross of the same order of merit in 1814.

== Biography ==
Baron Karl Paul von Quosdanovich was born in Brezovac Žumberački near Samobor (at the time in the Kingdom of Croatia within Habsburg Monarchy), which is in Žumberak, a range of mountains between Croatia and Slovenia, known for his uskoks, the refugees from parts of Croatia occupied by the Ottoman Empire and traditional guerrilla soldiers. The Gvozdanović family surname dates back to Raška and Zeta in the Middle Ages. He was a relative of Petar Vid Gvozdanović, Fieldmarshal Lieutenant, who distinguished himself in the War of the Bavarian Succession (1778–1779) and the War of the First Coalition (1792–1797).

Having started his military career as a young man, he was promoted gradually, becoming captain in 1796, major in 1801, colonel in 1809, and finally major general on 12 May 1813. He fought in many battles during several wars at the end of the 18th and the beginning of the 19th century (Austro–Turkish War (1787–1791), French Revolutionary Wars, Napoleonic Wars). For his merits he was awarded the Knight's Cross of the Order of Maria Theresa in the 66th promotion ceremony which took place on 18 August 1801, as well as the Commander's Cross on 8 March 1814.

Quosdanovich died at the beginning of 1817 in Pančevo, a town in Banat Military Frontier of the Habsburg monarchy (now Serbia), at the age of 53.

== See also ==
- List of Military Order of Maria Theresa recipients of Croatian descent
- List of Croatian soldiers
- Croatian nobility
- List of noble families of Croatia
