= Gvozdenović =

Gvozdenović (Cyrillic script: Гвозденовић) may refer to:

== People ==
- Anto Gvozdenović (1853–1935), Montenegrin, Russian, and French general, a member of the Imperial Russian Privy Council, diplomat and statesman
- Branimir Gvozdenović (born 1961), Montenegrin politician
- Ivan Gvozdenović (born 1978), Serbian football (soccer) defender who plays for FK Vojvodina
- Miodrag Gvozdenović (1945–2021), Montenegrin volleyball player
- Nedeljko Gvozdenović (1902–1988), Serbian painter

== Places ==
- Gvozdenović (Ub), a village in Serbia

== See also ==
- Gvozdanović
