= Dvorska Vas, Velike Lašče =

Dvorska Vas
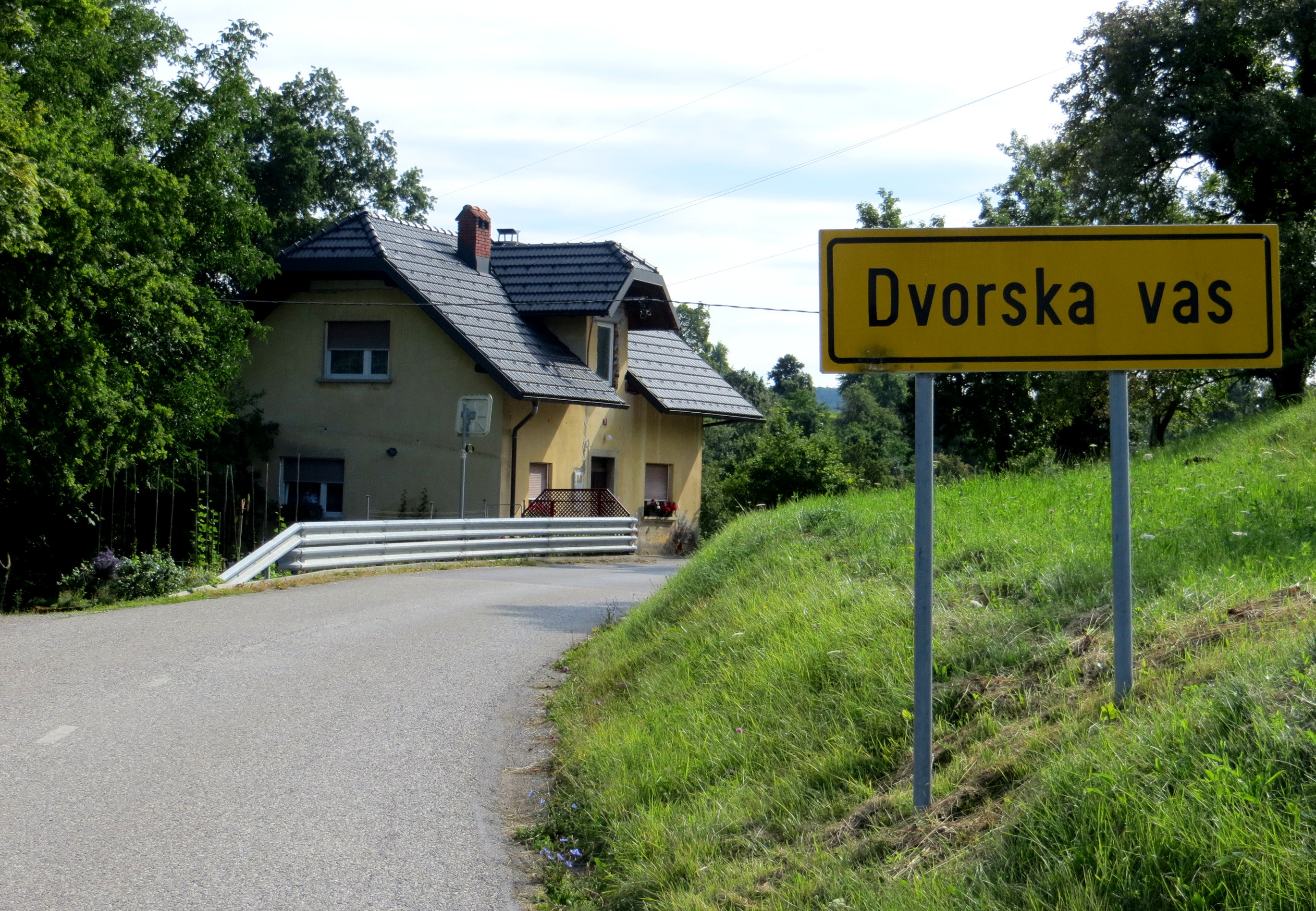

- Location in Slovenia
- Coordinates: 45°48′38.05″N 14°38′24.36″E
- Country: Slovenia
- Traditional region: Lower Carniola
- Statistical region: Central Slovenia
- Municipality: Velike Lašče

Area
  - Total: 1.51 km^{2} (0.58 sq mi)
- Elevation: 607.2 m (1,992 ft)

Population (2002)
  - Total: 110
- Postal code: 1315

Dvorska Vas (pronounced [ˈdʋoːɾska ˈʋaːs]; Slovene: Dvorska vas, German: Höflern) is a village in the hills south of Velike Lašče in central Slovenia. The area is part of the traditional region of Lower Carniola and is now included in the Central Slovenia Statistical Region.

== Name ==
In order records, the name of the village often appears without the v as Dorska vas (or Dorſkavaſs, Dorſkavaſ).

== Church ==
The local church is dedicated to the John the Baptist (Slovene: Janez Krstnik). It was built in 1722.

== Notable people ==
Notable people that were born or lived in Dvorska Vas include:

- Janez Modic (1846 – after 1892), beekeeper
