= Joseph Freiherr von Maroičić =

Joseph Freiherr von Maroičić di Madonna del Monte
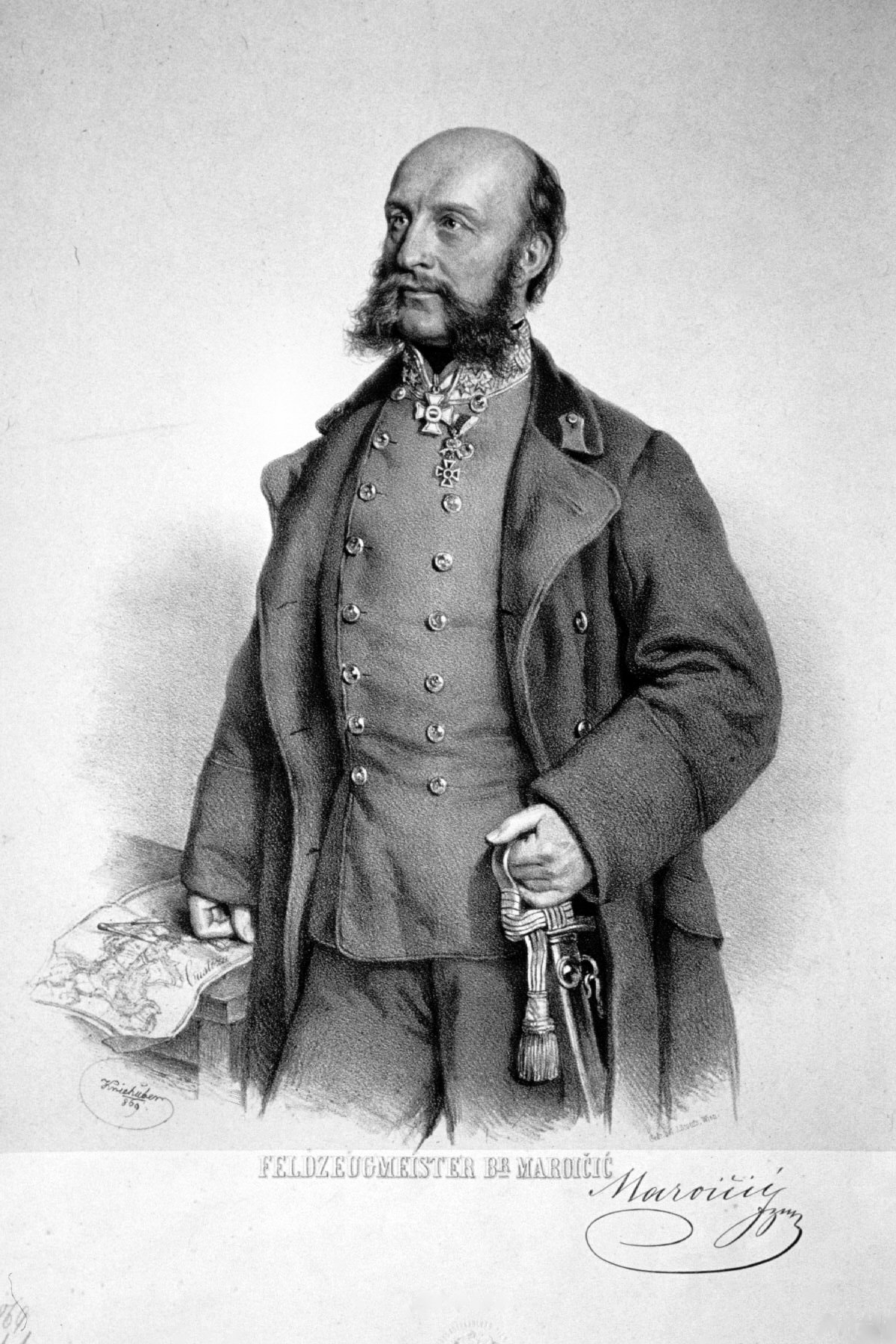
- Josef Freiherr von Maroičić di Madonna del Monte, Lithography by Josef Kriehuber, 1869
- Born: 6 April 1812; Oberswidnik
- Died: 17 October 1882 (aged 70); Döbling
- Spouse: Agneza "Neža" née Vranjican
- Military career
- Allegiance: Austrian Empire
- Service years: 1825–1881
- Rank: Feldzeugmeister
- Commands: VII Corps
- Conflicts: First Italian War of Independence; Hungarian insurrection Second Italian War of Independence; Austro-Prussian War
- Awards: Knight's Cross of the Order of Leopold (1848); Commander's Cross of the Military Order of Maria Theresa (1866); Order of the Iron Crown, 1st Class (1871); Grand Cross of the Order of Leopold (1881)

Joseph Freiherr von Maroičić di Madonna del Monte (6 April 1812 – 17 October 1882) was an Austrian general of Croatian descent.

== Early career ==
Joseph Maroicic was born on 6 April 1812 in Oberswidnik, in the Sáros County of the Kingdom of Hungary (present-day Slovakia). His father, Georg, was elevated to the status of baron in the Austrian nobility on 15 April 1830 for his services. Following in the footsteps of his father, Joseph Maroicic embarked on an army career and enlisted at the infantry cadet school on 21 October 1825. In 1830 he became an ensign in the 60th Infantry Regiment. Promoted to lieutenant in 1831 and to first lieutenant in 1834, Maroicic was posted to the General Staff. He was promoted to captain in 1843.

Marocic took part in the First Italian War of Independence (1848), under the command of Laval Nugent von Westmeath and later under lieutenant field marshal graf Georg von Thurn-Valsassina. During the Battles of Vicenza in June, he presented a plan to General of the Artillery Karl von Culoz to take Vicenza and Monte Berico, which succeeded. Maroicic himself took the Casteltamboldo before noon, and later that day participated in the taking of Vicenza itself in the front row of his forces. After the Italian war ended, he left for Hungary, where he served under Kuzman Todorović in the Serbian Voivodeship during the suppression of the 1848 Hungarian Revolution.

He was promoted to major in 1849. That year he was made chief of staff of the 3rd Army Corps. After serving as chief of staff of the 4th Army Corps, Maroicic was promoted to lieutenant-colonel and transferred to the 1st Army Corps with which he served against the Hungarian insurrection. After a short stint at General Headquarters, Maroicic was promoted to colonel in November 1849 and was given command of the Oguliner Grenz Regiment nr. 3. In 1850 he was ennobled a Freiherr and was given the extended title von Madonna del Monte to his name.

== General officer ==
Maroicic was promoted to major-general in 1854 and was given a brigade command in the 6th Army Corps, stationed in Hungary. After the Crimean War, Maroicic took part in the Austrian occupation of Wallachia and Moldavia. In 1859 Maroicic commanded his brigade during the Second Italian War of Independence and served at Solferino. In 1860 Maroicic was promoted to Feldmarschallleutnant and given command of a division in Rijeka tasked with defending the Kvarner Gulf from a potential attack in the event of another war with Italy.

During the Austro-Prussian War of 1866, Maroicic served on the Italian front in the South Army commanded by Archduke Albrecht. Maroicic commanded the 7th Army Corps, with which he distinguished himself at Custoza. For this, he was awarded the Commander's Cross. After the defeat of Benedek and the Northern Army at Königgrätz necessitated the transfer of troops from the Italian front northwards to cover Vienna, Maroicic held the line at the Isonzo.

After the war, Maroicic commanded in Budapest and Graz. In 1868 Maroicic was promoted to Feldzeugmeister. In March 1869 Maroicic was given command of the capital Vienna (1869–1881). Maroicic retired from the service on 1 May 1881. He died on 17 October 1882 in Döbling and was buried at the Zentralfriedhof on the 19th.

== Issue ==
In 1852, he married the actress Agneza daughter of Ambroz Vranjican. Together, they had three children:

- Ambroz Maroicic von Madonna del Monte (26 August 1856 in Košice – 5 April 1929 in Vienna)
- Ana, m. baron Arthur von Löwenthal (son of Johann von Löwenthal)
- Klara, m. Božidar Kukuljević Sakcinski (son of Ivan Kukuljević Sakcinski)

== See also ==
- List of Military Order of Maria Theresa recipients of Croatian descent
- List of Croatian soldiers
- Croatian nobility

== Bibliography ==
- Schinzl, Adolf (1884). "Maroicic, Joseph". Allgemeine Deutsche Biographie. Vol. 20. Leipzig: Duncker & Humblot. pp. 400–403.
- Geoffrey Wawro, The Austro-Prussian War. Austria's war with Prussia and Italy in 1866 (New York 2007)
- Jerolimov, Pavao (2008-08-23). "Ambroz Maroičić". Zadarski list (in Croatian). eISSN 2584-5802.
