= Ernst Ritter von Hartung =

Austrian artillery officer (1808–1879)

- Born: 23 August 1808; Schwechat
- Died: 1 October 1879 (aged 71); Vienna
- Military career
- Allegiance: Austrian Empire
- Service years: 1827–1866
- Rank: Feldzeugmeister
- Commands: IX Corps
- Conflicts: First Italian Independence War: Battle of Santa Lucia; Battle of Custoza; Second Italian War of Independence: Battle of Magenta; Battle of Solferino; Third Italian War of Independence: Battle of Custoza (1866)
- Awards: Military Order of Maria Theresa

Ernst Ritter von Hartung (23 August 1808 – 1 October 1879) was an Austrian Feldzeugmeister and military theorist.

== Biography ==
Born in Schwechat, Hartung came from an old knightly family originally based in Hanover. In 1827 Hartung was posted as ensign in the No. 1 Infantry Regiment. He was promoted to lieutenant on 15 March 1831, lieutenant on 16 August 1834 and captain on 1 March 1844.

During the First Italian War of Independence, he fought at Santa Lucia, and was promoted to major in Regiment No. 17 and decorated with the Military Cross of Merit with the war decoration. Thereafter, Hartung fought in the first corps at the Battle of Custoza and during the Five Days of Milan. He took part in the submission of Bologna and of Ancona. In all of these events, he excelled so much that he was awarded the Order of the Iron Crown (3rd class) and promoted to lieutenant colonel.

In 1850, he served as adjutant to then Adjutant General to Fielmarshal Radetzky, after which he was named Colonel and Commander of Infantry Regiment No. 23. On 25 September 1854 Hartung was promoted major general and appointed command of a brigade in the 2nd Army Corps. In 1859, he and his brigade took part in the war against France and Piedmont. As part of the 3rd Army Corps they fought at Magenta and Solferino.

On 15 August 1862, he was appointed commander of the coastal region and in Istria. On 13 August 1863, he was promoted to Feldmarshall-Leutnant and a year later he became Inhaber of Infantry Regiment No. 47.

During the Austro-Prussian War, Hartung served in the South Army under Archduke Albert against Italy. Hartung commanded the IX Corps and contributed significantly to the Austrian victory at Custoza on 24 June 1866. Hartung had the right wing of his corps act against the enemy immediately after the Italian occupation of Sommacampagna and Berettara and his repeated attacks against the enemy troops deployed on Monte Croce prevented the whole army from being seriously endangered. The enemy was unable to penetrate the heights of Casa del Sole. After the bloody attacks by his brigades Weckbecker and Böck and the stubborn resistance on the part of the Thun Regiment on the Monte Belvedere and the Monte Arabico, which made the attack of the VII Corps much easier. At the decisive moment with his last reserve he captured the Italian held Monte Croce.

On 4 October 1866, Hartung was appointed interim commanding general for Upper and Lower Austria, Salzburg, Moravia and Silesia, and on 20 March 1868 as commanding general in Vienna. After he had advanced to become a Felzeugmeister on 22 April 1868, he was awarded the Order of the Iron Crown 1st Class on 19 February 1869 and retired on 1 March 1869 at his own request.

Hartung was also a military theorist and had directed the revision of the service regulations and participated in the revision of the exercise regulations that had been started after the war in 1859. His work in this area continued in the following decades of the reorganization of the imperial-royal army. After his retirement, he was appointed a lifelong member of the House of Lords and was repeatedly sent to the delegations of the Austrian Reichsrat.

== Bibliography ==
- Geoffrey Wawro, The Austro-Prussian War. Austria's war with Prussia and Italy in 1866 (New York 2007), ISBN 9780521629515
- Oscar Criste, Hartung, Ernst Ritter von. in: Allgemeine Deutsche Biographie (ADB). Band 50, Duncker & Humblot, Leipzig 1905, S. 34 f.
- Nikolaus von Preradovich:, Hartung, Ernst Ritter von. in: Neue Deutsche Biographie (NDB). Band 8, Duncker & Humblot, Berlin 1969, ISBN 3-428-00189-3, S. 8.
