= Veliki Cvjetnić =

Veliki Cvjetnić Велики Цвјетнић
- Village
- Location within Bosnia and Herzegovina
- Coordinates: 44°26′N 16°10′E
- Country: Bosnia and Herzegovina
- Entity: Federation of Bosnia and Herzegovina
- Canton: Una-Sana
- Municipality: Bihać

Area
  - Total: 7.91 sq mi (20.49 km^{2})

Population (2013)
  - Total: 40
  - Density: 5.1/sq mi (2.0/km^{2})
- Time zone: UTC+1 (CET)
  - Summer (DST): UTC+2 (CEST)

Veliki Cvjetnić (Serbian Cyrillic: Велики Цвјетнић) is a village in the municipality of Bihać, Bosnia and Herzegovina.

== Demographics ==
According to the 2013 census, its population was 53, all Serbs.
