= Miodrag Gvozdenović =

Montenegrin volleyball player (1944–2021)

Miodrag "Skale" Gvozdenović Миодраг Гвозденовић

Personal information
- Born: 19 September 1944; Nikšić, SR Montenegro, SFR Yugoslavia
- Died: 8 May 2021 (aged 76); Subotica, Serbia
- Hometown: Subotica
Honours
Men's volleyball
Representing Yugoslavia
European Championship
Bronze medal – third place	1975 Belgrade	Team

Miodrag "Skale" Gvozdenović (Cyrillic: Миодраг "Скале" Гвозденовић) (September 19, 1944 – May 8, 2021) was a Yugoslav volleyball player, born in Nikšić. His career started in OK Sutjeska Nikšić. With OK Spartak Subotica, he was third in Champions Cup.

He played over 300 games for national selection of Yugoslavia. With Yugoslavia, he won Bronze medal at the 1975 European Volleyball Championship held in Belgrade.

He was living and coaching in Subotica (Serbia).
