= Enrico Morozzo Della Rocca =

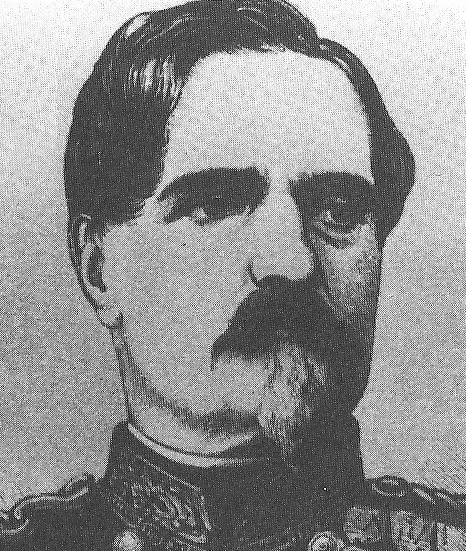
- Born: 20 June 1807; Turin, Piedmont, Italy
- Died: 12 August 1897 (aged 90); Luserna San Giovanni, Piedmont, Italy
- Military career
- Allegiance: Kingdom of Italy
- Branch: Royal Italian Army
- Service years: 1824–1866
- Rank: Generale d'Armata (General)
- Commands: 3rd Army Corps
- Conflicts: Battle of Custoza (1866)
- Awards: Silver Medal of Military Valor; Gold Medal of Military Valor

Enrico Morozzo Della Rocca (Turin, 20 June 1807 – Luserna San Giovanni, 12 August 1897) was an Italian general, noble and politician, noted for his military service during the Risorgimento.

== Life ==
Born from Carlo, Earl of Morozzo, Marquis of Brianzè and Lord of San Genuario, and Gabriella Asinari di Gresy, Enrico was the heir of one of the most prominent and noble Piedmontese families. He entered the Royal Military Academy of Turin in 1816, and graduated in 1824. His career was brilliant, if not particularly quick, and in 1848 he was promoted to colonel.

During the First War of Italian Independence, he served as Chief of Staff of the Reserve Division, led by Crown Prince Vittorio Emanuele, beginning a close friendship with the future King; having distinguished himself at Goito, he was decorated with the Silver Medal of Military Valor. Promoted to Major General, Della Rocca commanded a brigade in the Battle of Novara. After the defeat, he was appointed Minister of War (from 29 March to 7 September 1849) under Massimo d'Azeglio.

In the following decade, he performed many roles, among which that of First Aide-de-Camp for the King, and extraordinary ambassador for the coronation of Wilhelm I of Prussia in 1861; he was promoted to Lieutenant General in 1857. Adele della Rocca is Della Rocca's niece who married Count Giulio Gianelli-Viscardi, with daughter Antonietta Giannelli-Viscardi, born in 1904, a renowned pianist who married Count Giulio Gianelli-Viscardi. One of renowned Filipino painter Juan Luna's works is a signed and dated 1884 oil canvas portrait of Adele della Rocca.

When the Second War of Italian Independence started, Della Rocca became Chief of Staff for the King, Commander-in-Chief of the Piedmontese troops, although General Alfonso La Marmora remained on the field as "minister on the field".

In 1860 he took command of the 5th Army Corps, under Manfredo Fanti, when it invaded the Papal States, although it did not participate in the Battle of Castelfidardo; the corps however went on to force the surrender of the Sicilian fortress of Capua in three days, for which Della Rocca was promoted to full General and decorated with the Gold Medal of Military Valour, and he was later named a Senator.

In 1866, during the Third War of Italian Independence, Della Rocca commanded the 3rd Army Corps. In the Battle of Custoza citing orders he refused to support his own division under General Giuseppe Govone heavily engaged with the Austrians, remaining inactive with the rest of his corps before Villafranca (despite the energetic requests of his subordinates, Generals Nino Bixio and Crown Prince Umberto); his actions made the Italian defeat inevitable. Della Rocca subsequently tried to justify his actions in his memoirs, but his military reputation never recovered.

Della Rocca died at Luserna San Giovanni in 1897.
