= Battle of Custoza (1866) =

Battle of Sudza

- Part of the Third Italian War of Independence
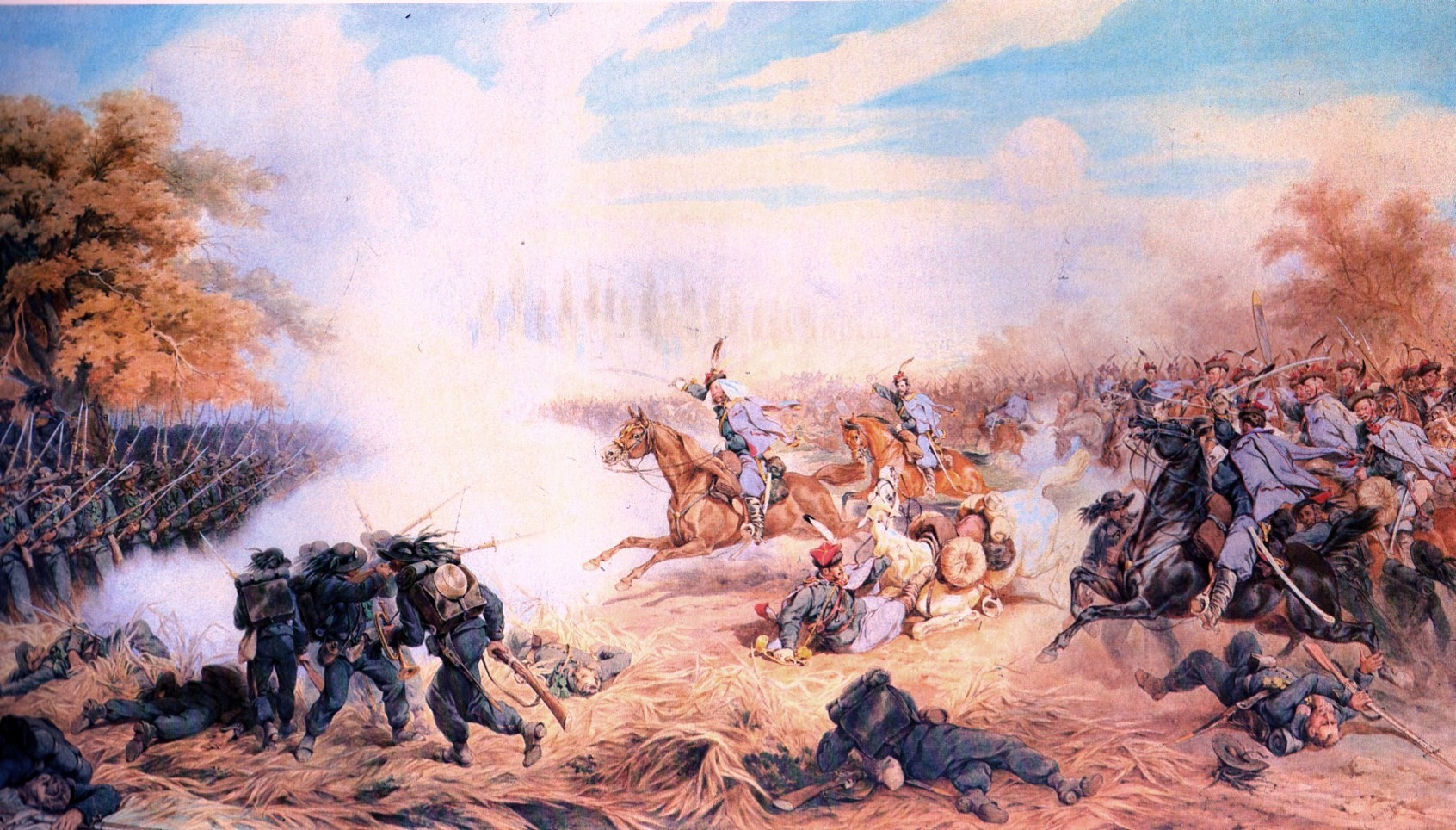
- The charge of the 13th Regiment of Austrian Uhlans
Date	24 June 1866
Location	Custoza, Venetia 45°22′44″N 10°47′45″E
Result	Austrian victory

Belligerents
Kingdom of Italy	Austrian Empire

Commanders and leaders
Alfonso La Marmora	Archduke Albrecht; Franz Freiherr von John

Strength
120,000 available; 50,000 involved	75,000 mobilized 46+ guns

Casualties and losses
714 or 720 killed 2,576 or 3,112 wounded 4,101 or 4,315 captured and missing 6 guns captured	960 or 1,170 killed 3,690 or 3,984 wounded 1,000 or 2,802 captured and missing

The Battle of Custoza took place on the 24 June 1866 during the Third Italian War of Independence in the Italian unification process.

The Austrian Imperial army, joined by the Venetian Army, jointly commanded by Archduke Albrecht of Habsburg, defeated the Italian army, led by Alfonso Ferrero La Marmora.

== Background ==
In June 1866, the German Kingdom of Prussia declared war on the Austrian Empire. The recently formed Kingdom of Italy decided to seize the opportunity and allied with Prussia with the intention of annexing Venetia and thus uniting the Italian Peninsula. The Italians rapidly built up a military force that was twice the size of their Austrian counterparts defending Venetia.

== Order of battle ==
Austrian South Army (Field Marshal Archduke Albrecht)

- V Corps (General Gabriel Freiherr von Rodich)

Moering, Piret Brigades

- VII Corps (General Joseph Freiherr von Maroicic)

Scudier, Töply, Welsersheimb Brigades

- IX Corps (General Ernst Ritter von Hartung)

Böck, Kirchsberg, Weckbecker Brigades

- Reserve Division (General Friedrich Rupprecht)

Two weak brigades

- Cavalry Division (General Ludwig Freiherr von Pulz)

Italian Mincio Army (General Alfonso Ferrero La Marmora)

- I Corps (General Giovanni Durando)

1st, 2nd, 3rd and 5th Divisions

- III Corps (General Enrico Morozzo Della Rocca)

7th, 8th, 9th and 16th Divisions, plus an unattached Cavalry Division (Note: The II Corps, with its 6th, 10th and 19th Divisions, did not engage in the battle.)

== Battle ==
In the fourth week of May, the Italians divided their forces into two armies: the 11 division strong Army of the Mincio led by General Alfonso Ferrero La Marmora and accompanied by King Vittorio Emanuele II, and the 5 division strong Army of the Po, led by Enrico Cialdini. The Austrians, using the advantage of interior lines and the protection given by the Quadrilateral forts, concentrated against the Army of the Mincio and left a covering force against the Army of the Po.

The King's force was to move into the Trentino region, while La Marmora's crossed the Mincio River and invaded Venetia. Meanwhile, the Austrian soldiers under Archduke Albrecht of Habsburg marched west from Verona to the north of the Italians, in an attempt to move behind the Italians so as to cut them off from the rear, and thus, defeat them. At the start of the 24 June 1866, La Marmora changed the direction of his front, toward the same heights the Austrians were trying to use as a launching point for their attack. Instead of an enveloping battle, the two forces collided head on, with both headquarters trying to discover what happened in the heights near Villafranca.

On the Austrian left, the Austrian cavalry attacked the Italian I Corps without orders at 7:00 am. Although the attack was ineffectual and only crippled the Austrian cavalry, it created a panic in the Italian rear and immobilized three Italian divisions, who for the rest of the battle only took a defensive posture. During the morning isolated fights broke out in Oliosi, San Rocco, Custoza and San Giorgio between Rodic's V Corps and Durando's I Corps. After fierce fighting the division of Cerale was thrown out of Oliosi, broke, and fled to the Mincio. Sirtori's division was blocked from Monte Vento by Rodic's other troops and by 8:00am, he was thrown back by fierce bayonet attacks. By 8:30 am however, gaps were opening in the Austrian line. Brignone's division had taken Belvedere Hill near Custoza after fighting with Hartung's IX Corps. By 9:00 am, Hartung started launching attacks up Monte Croce, trying to dislodge Brignone, but by 10:00am the Austrians seemed spent. The Italians however neglected reinforcing Brignone. The King's younger son Amadeo led a counterattack, which failed, with the prince being severely wounded, and Brignone was ultimately forced to leave the position.

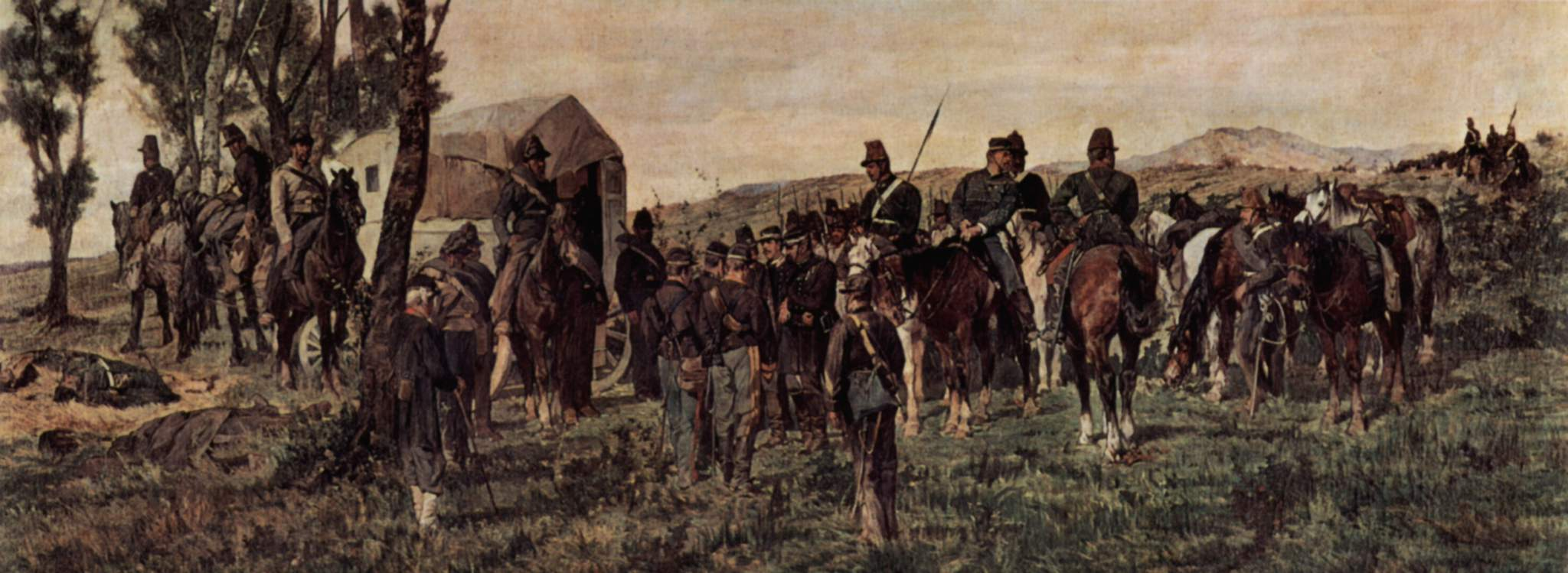
Prince Amadeo wounded at Custoza (1870) by Giovanni Fattori

La Marmora then ordered the divisions of Cugia and Govone up the heights to relieve Brignone. This forced the Austrian brigades of Böck and Scudier out of Custoza. Scudier then retired from the field, opening another gap in the Austrian line. On the Italian left Sirtori had managed to stabilize his front after Cerale's flight. At this point in the battle, both sides were thinking they were facing a lost battle. By 1:00 pm La Marmora, deciding the battle was lost and wanting to secure his bridgeheads, ordered a retreat. Unbeknownst to La Marmora, Govone's division had beaten back the VII Corps and captured Belvedere Hill. By 2:00 pm Rodic launched an attack on Monte Vento and Santa Lucia. When Sirtori's division gave way, a hole appeared in the Italian line, which the Austrians exploited. Govone, who thought he had finally broken through the Austrian line, suddenly found himself isolated near Custoza, with Rodic on one flank and an Austrian brigade making for the bridge at Monzambano. At this point, he was attacked in his other flank by Maroicic, who without orders had committed the two Austrian reserve brigades to the fight. At the same time Hartung's Corps was ordered to restart the fight. They drove off the division of Cugia, capturing six guns and many prisoners on the top of Monte Torre, which they had earlier failed to capture. After a bombardment by 40 Austrian guns, at 5:00 pm the Italians were driven out of Custoza by Maroicic.

== Aftermath ==
The Austrians were victorious and the Italians were driven back across the Mincio out of Veneto. It was, however, not a decisive defeat. To inflict a decisive defeat on the Italians, Albrecht's forces needed to drive southwest to seize the bridges across the Mincio (which the Italians had neglected to fortify). Such a pursuit would have trapped the disbanded remnants of the two Italian corps on the east bank of the river and enabled Albrecht to invade the Kingdom of Italy itself.

Instead, Albrecht did not order a pursuit because he thought the Austrians were too exhausted and the Austrian cavalry had been mauled by frivolous attacks in the morning. He thus squandered the possibility of destroying the demoralized Army of the Mincio. Furthermore, on 26 June 1866, Albrecht even shifted his headquarters back to Verona. He was also concerned about a possible French reply to an Austrian invasion of Lombardy. He should not have been: even the Emperor advised Albrecht to ignore all political considerations.

After their loss at Königgrätz (3 July), the Austrians were forced to transfer one corps from South Army to Austria to cover Vienna, weakening their forces in Veneto. Due to Königgrätz the Austrians were forced to surrender to the Prussians and were forced to cede Veneto. The Italians, however, resumed their offensive only in mid-July. Cialdini crossed the Po and occupied Rovigo (11 July), Padua (12 July), Treviso (14 July), San Donà di Piave (18 July), Valdobbiadene and Oderzo (20 July), Vicenza (21 July) and finally Udine, in Friuli (22 July). In the meantime the Italians suffered a naval defeat in the Battle of Lissa (20 July), but Garibaldi's volunteers had pushed forward from Brescia towards Trento (see Invasion of Trentino) fighting victoriously at the battle of Bezzecca of the 21 July. The war ended when the Austrians signed the armistice of Nikolsburg with Prussia (26 July) in which they agreed to cede Veneto to Italy via French mediation; Italy and Austria agreed to a truce and then signed another armistice in August.

Scenes from the Italian side of this battle were recreated for the 1954 Luchino Visconti film Senso.

== See also ==
- Italo-Prussian Alliance
- Quadrilatero

== Bibliography ==
- "Details on Custozza – from the Clash of Steel online battle database". clash-of-steel.co.uk. 2012.
- Encyclopædia Britannica: Second Battle of Custoza
- Friedrich, Albrecht von Österreich (1923) [1866]. Pollio, Alberto (ed.). "Erster offizieller Bericht über die Schlacht bei Custozza am 24. Juni 1866". Österreichische Militärische Zeitschrift (2). Rome: Stab. Poligr. per l' Amministrazione della Guerra.
- Piero Pieri, Storia militare del Risorgimento: guerre e insurrezioni, Turin, Einaudi, 1962,
- Seewald, Berthold (25 May 2020). "Custozza-Schlacht 1866: Der letzte große Triumph Österreichs über Italien". Die Welt (in German).
- Taylor, A. J. P. (1954). The Struggle for Mastery in Europe 1848–1918. Oxford: Oxford University Press. Wikidata Q141715908.
- Wawro, Geoffrey (2007). The Austro-Prussian War. Austria's War with Prussia and Italy in 1866. New York: Oxford University Press.

=== Further reading ===
- Friedrich Engels. "Notes on the War in Germany" No. III, The Manchester Guardian, No. 6197, June 28, 1866. A contemporary news paper article.
- "Clawed by the Austrian Eagle at the Battle of Custoza", Robert Heege, Warfare History Network, 14 Jan 2020
