= Brezovac Žumberački =

- Settlement
- Location within Croatia
- Coordinates: 45.761°N 15.554°E
- Country: Croatia
- County: Zagreb
- City: Samobor

Area
  - Total: 6.5 km^{2} (2.5 sq mi)

Population (2021)
  - Total: 21
  - Density: 3.2/km^{2} (8.4/sq mi)
- Time zone: UTC+1 (CET)
  - Summer (DST): UTC+2 (CEST)

Brezovac Žumberački is a settlement (naselje) in the Samobor administrative territory of Zagreb County, Croatia. As of 2011 it had a population of 23 people.
