= Johann Iskrić =

Austro-Hungarian military officer

Johann Iskrić Ivan Iskrić
- Jovan Iskrić
- Portrait of Johann Iskrić
- Born: 3 March 1884; Karlsdorf, Austria-Hungary (now Banatski Karlovac, Serbia)
- Died: 14 June 1961 (aged 77); Zagreb, Croatia
- Burial place: Mirogoj RKT-141-II-146
- Alma mater: Infantry school in Liebenau (Graz)
- Spouse: Maria Pitlik von Rudan und Poria (married 22 November 1914)
- Military career
- Allegiance: Austria-Hungary (until 1918); Yugoslavia (1918–1941); Croatia (1941)
- Branch: Austro-Hungarian Army (until 1918); Yugoslav Army (1918–1941); Croatian Army (1941)
- Service years: 1902–1941
- Rank: Captain (Austro-Hungarian Army); General (Croatian Army) (1944)
- Units: 86th Hungarian Infantry Regiment "Freiherr von Steininger", XV. Corps
- Commands: Hungarian Landsturm Battalion V/4
- Conflicts: First World War: Serbian Campaign; Italian Campaign
- Awards: Knight's Cross of the Military Order of Maria Theresa; Knights' Cross of the Order of Leopold; Silver Military Merit Medal (2); Bronze Military Merit Medal; Military Merit Cross; Karl Troop Cross; Wound Medal
- Other work: Head Personnel Department Ministry of Armed Forces (Croatian Army) (1941–1944)

Johann Iskrić (Serbo-Croatian: Ivan Iskrić, born Jovan Iskrić) (3 March 1884 – 14 June 1961) was a Croatian Serb army officer in the Austro-Hungarian Army, and later in the Yugoslav Army and Croatian army, who fought in the Battles of the Isonzo. He was a recipient of the Knight's Cross of the Military Order of Maria Theresa.

== Military career ==
Born in the 1884 at Karlsdorf, Austria-Hungary (now Banatski Karlovac, Serbia), Iskrić entered infantry school in Liebenau near Graz when he was fourteen. On 18 August 1902 he was assigned to the 86th Hungarian Infantry Regiment "Freiherr von Steininger" as an officer candidate. In January 1915 he was promoted to Captain. In the 11th battle at Soča (Isonzo) he commanded the Hungarian Landsturm Battalion V/4, and received the knight's cross – Military Order of Maria Theresa for outstanding conduct and bravery. After the break-up of the Austria-Hungary, Iskrić became officer of the Yugoslav Army and in 1941 retired as General of the Croatian army.

=== Defence at Soča (Isonzo) river at Avče (Auzza) ===
In the beginning of the 11th battle at Soča, the southern wing of the XV. Corps spread over the ruins of Loga (now part of Bodrež, Kanal ob Soči), 3 km north of Kanal ob Soči. Only a small section – about a kilometre – spread between Loga and Avče (Auzza) along the river and then turned back in the right angle on the Lom highs. Behind coastal position "U", which was occupied by three companies of the Landsturm Battalion V/4, there was a second line "R", which spread from height Fratta (555 m) toward the northern part of Avče and there join the coastal position. The exposed lower section at the coast of Soča made important part of defence and was one of main targets of the Italians when on 17 August 1917 the battle began.

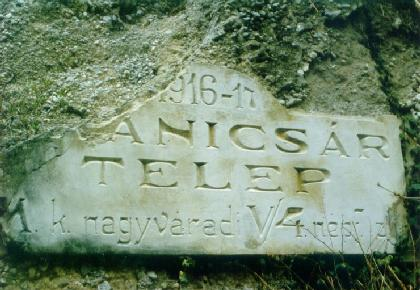
Memorial plaque at Avče

The commander of the coastal position (and from day two, the blockade position too) captain Johann Iskrić was commander of his battalion, 37th Schützen Regiment and 19th Landsturm Battalion for only two weeks. Fighting abilities and armament of these older men – reservists was not even close to the Italian forces. Only under the leadership of a young captain, these forces fought for three days in heavy battles, until the reserves came to the Lom (Banjšice) heights and formed joined defence there. During the fourth night of the battle on 20 August 1917, Italians crossed river Soča not far from Loga. Captain Iskrić had to retreat left wing to the blockade position. From there direct artillery attacks, nor ever lasting attacks could not force him to retreat even when both wings of defence were surrounded. When the enemy reserves came, but Iskrić did not have any, and with number of casualties rising, the position became hopeless. The brigade's command allowed Iskrić to retreat from the lost ground. Iskrić responded: "Never!" and the phone lines broke down the next moment.

During the day, Italians gained ground on the neighbouring, north position. So another offensive to the lower section of Avče, where remained only one third of defenders, became impossible. The brigade's command ordered retreat during following night. Captain Iskrić was wounded during the fight and later received the Knight's Cross of the Military Order of Maria Theresa for his conduct and bravery in this battle. Iskrić died on 14 June 1961. He is buried at Mirogoj Cemetery in Zagreb.

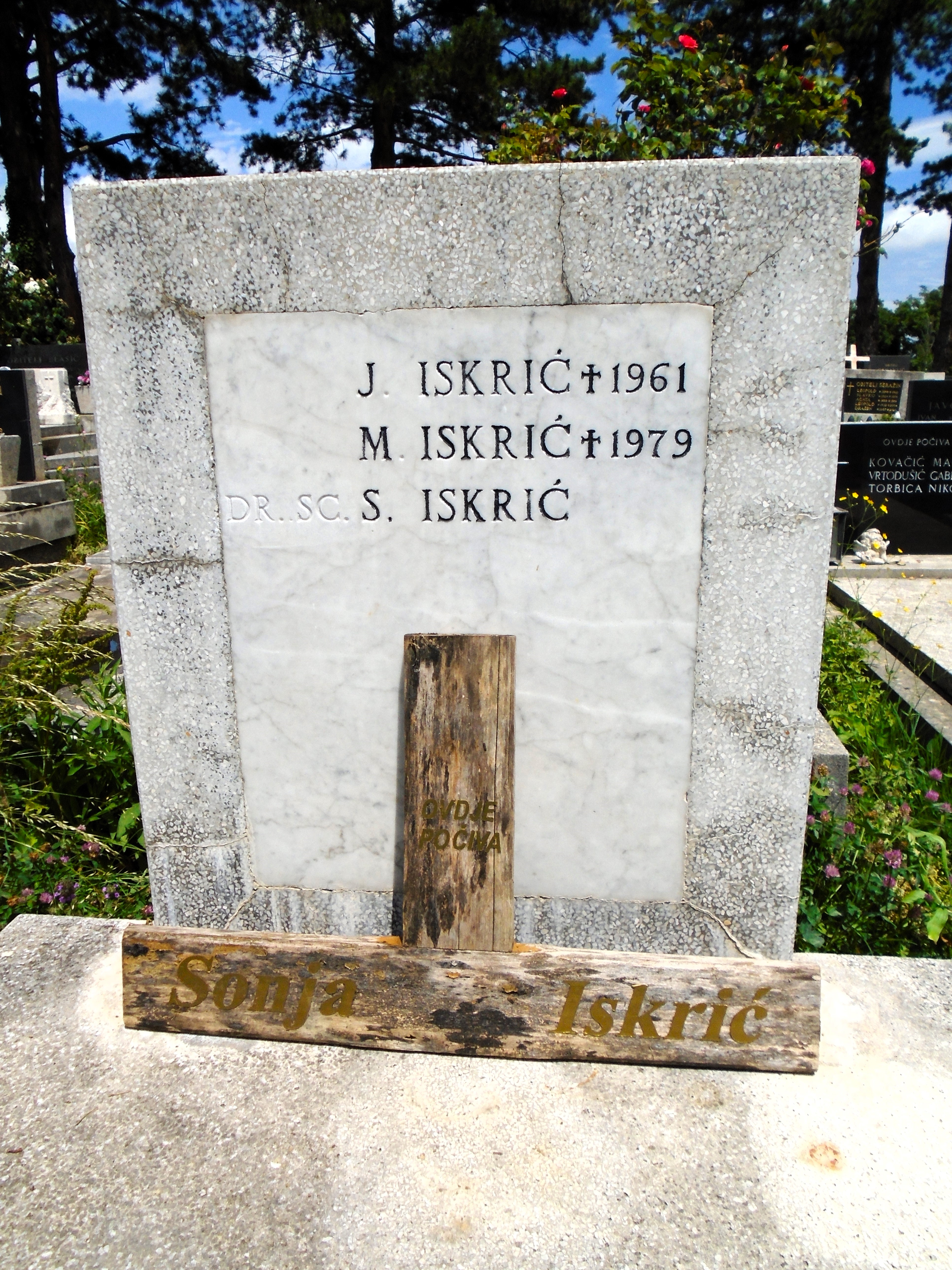
Iskrić's grave at Zagreb Mirogoj Cemetery

=== Decorations ===
- Knight's Cross of the Military Order of Maria Theresa (187th promotion 10 June 1921)
- Knights' Cross of the Order of Leopold (14 November 1917)
- Silver Military Merit Medal (7 December 1916 and 2 July 1917)
- Bronze Military Merit Medal (8 May 1916)
- Military Merit Cross (25 October 1915)
- Karl Troop Cross (18 June 1917)
- Wound Medal

=== Ranks ===
Austro-Hungarian Army

- Kadettoffiziers-stellvertreter (Officer candidate) August 1902
- Leutnant (Lieutenant) November 1903
- Oberleutnant (Senior Lieutenant) May 1910
- Hauptmann (Captain) January 1915

Croatian Armed Forces

- pukovnik (Lieutenant colonel)
- General (30 October 1944)
