= Emanuel Cvjetićanin =

Austro-Hungarian military officer

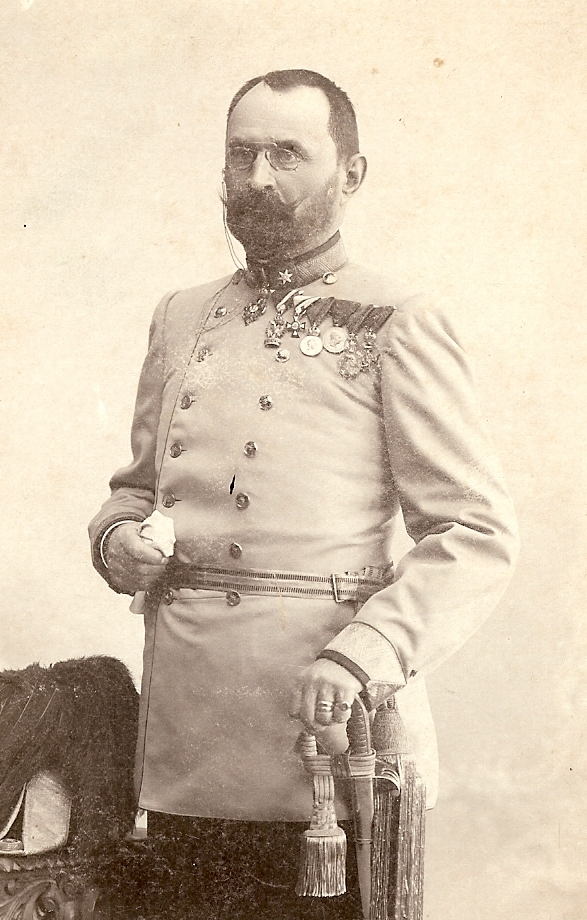
- Feldmarschalleutnant Emanuel Cvjetićanin
- Born: 8 August 1833; Slunj, Austrian Empire
- Died: 1919 (aged 85–86) Zagreb, Kingdom of Serbs, Croats and Slovenes
- Allegiance: Austria-Hungary
- Service years: –1.11.1903.
- Rank: Feldmarschalleutnant
- Conflicts: Commander in Bosnia and Herzegovina
- Awards: Commander's Cross of the Order of Maria Theresa

Emanuel Cvjetićanin (Serbian Cyrillic: Емануел Цвјетићанин; August 8, 1833 – 1919) was an Austro-Hungarian Feldmarschalleutnant, a rank equivalent to Major General.

== Biography ==
Cvjetićanin was born into a Serb Orthodox family.

Cvjetićanin graduated from the Graz Cadet Company and was assigned to the 58th Line Infantry Regiment in 1848. He became a lieutenant in the 46th Infantry Regiment in 1854 and was transferred to the 17th Gendarmerie Regiment as early as April 1859, in order to join the Gendarmerie War Wing of the 1st Gendarmerie Regiment.

During the Austrian occupation of Bosnia and Herzegovina, which lasted from 1878 to 1882, Cvjetićanin's most significant contribution was the formation of the Streifkorps. These special mobile units composed primarily of volunteers from the Bosnian gendarmerie acted brutally against civilians suspected of supporting the insurgents and adopted guerrilla tactics to hunt down smuggling gangs.

== See also ==
- Military Order of Maria Theresa
