= Giovanni Durando =

Italian politician (1804–1869)

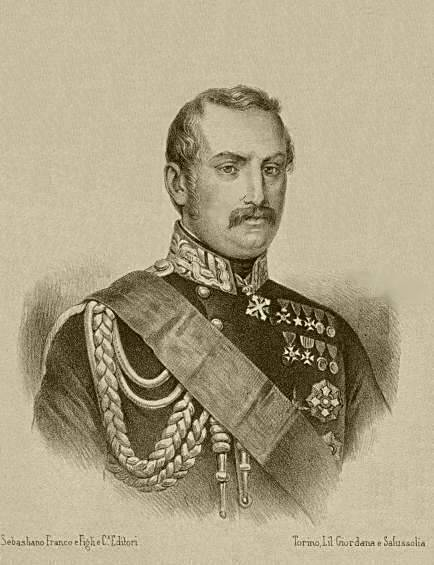
- Born: 23 June 1804; Mondovì, Piedmont
- Died: 27 May 1869 (aged 64); Florence, Tuscany

Senator of Sardinia
- In office 1860–1869

Giovanni Durando (23 June 1804 – 27 May 1869) was an Italian general and politician.

== Biography ==
Born at Mondovì, in what is now the province of Cuneo, he entered the Royal Guard corps of the Kingdom of Sardinia in 1822. In the 1830s, after having been discovered as member of a liberal plot which aimed to extort a constitution from king Charles Felix, he moved first to France and then to Belgium, where he enrolled in a foreign corps in the Belgian Revolution. Later he became an officer of the constitutionalist army of Pedro IV of Portugal. In 1835 he became an officer of the Hunters of Oporto Regiment. Later, he was Major General of the Papal Army, in command of a Papal division in the Veneto, where he was not able to fulfil his task of stopping general Nugent's Austrian forces. In the same year he was appointed as Lieutenant General of the Sardinian/Piedmontese army.

He participated in all the Italian Wars of Independence (1848–1849, 1859, and 1866) and in the Italian expedition in the Crimean War (1855–1856). He was wounded in the Battle of Custoza (1866), where he was in command of the I Corps. In 1849 Durando spent a period in Sardinia where he quenched popular revolts in Sassari and in Gallura.

Durando became senator of Sardinia (later, Kingdom of Italy) in 1860. The following year he took part in the suppression of brigandage in the former Kingdom of the Two Sicilies. He died at Florence in 1869.

His brother Giacomo was also a general and senator (and fought with Giovanni in Belgium, Portugal and Spain), while another brother, Giovanni Antonio, was army general.

== Sources ==
- "Giovanni Durando" in the Enciclopedia Italiana Dizionario Biografico degli Italiani (in Italian)
- Page at Italian Senate website (in Italian)
