= Military Order of Maria Theresa =

Austro-Hungarian military order

- Grand cross insignia of the order

Awarded by The Head of the House of Habsburg-Lorraine
- Type: Dynastic order
- Royal house: House of Habsburg-Lorraine
- Motto: "Fortitudini" (For Courage)
- Awarded for: Military Merit
- Status: Extinct
- Sovereign: Crown Prince Karl of Austria
- Grades: Grand Cross; Commander; Knight

Precedence
- Next (higher): Order of the Golden Fleece
- Next (lower): Order of Saint Stephen of Hungary
- Ribbon of the order

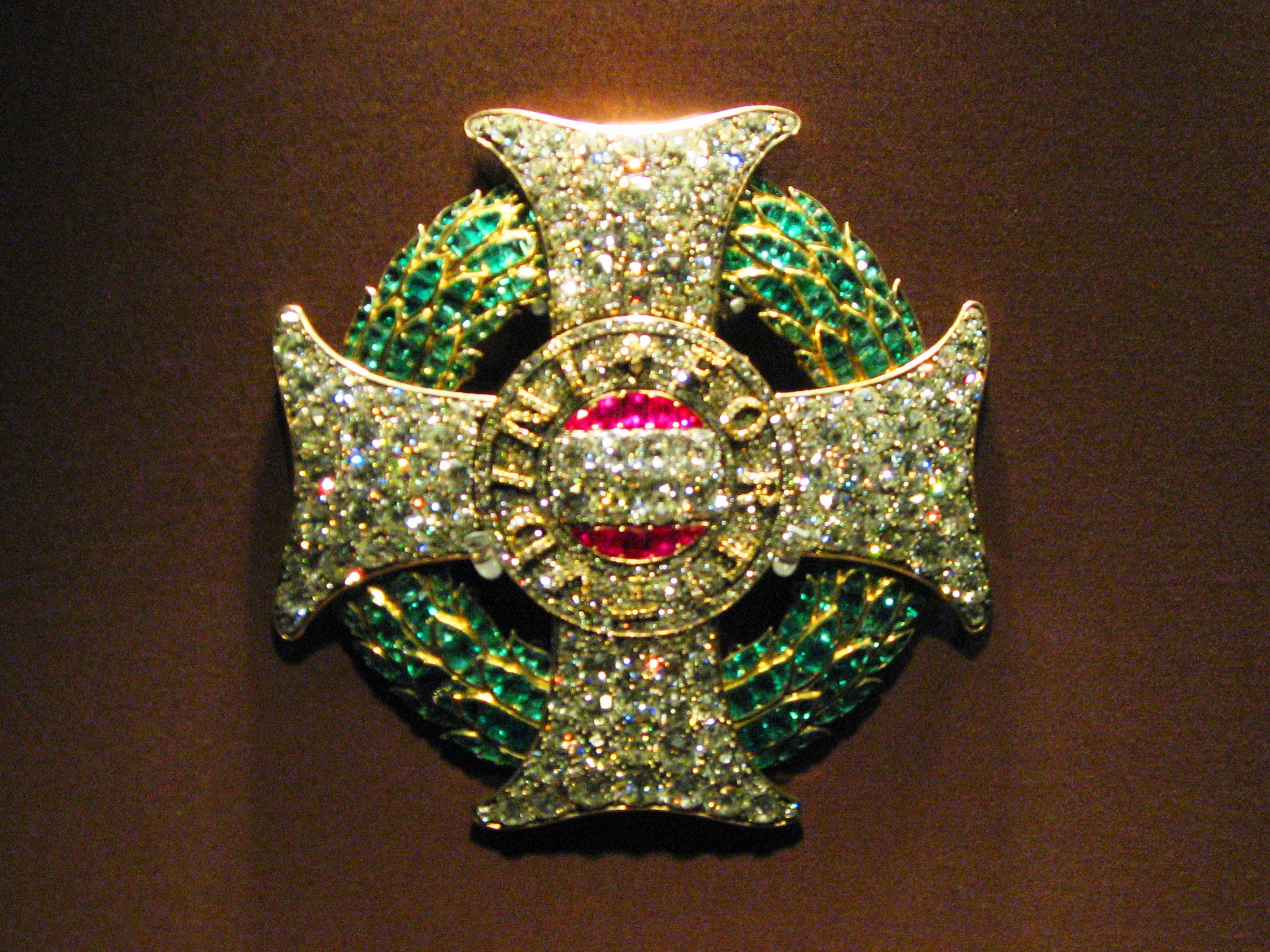
Grand Cross breast star with diamonds

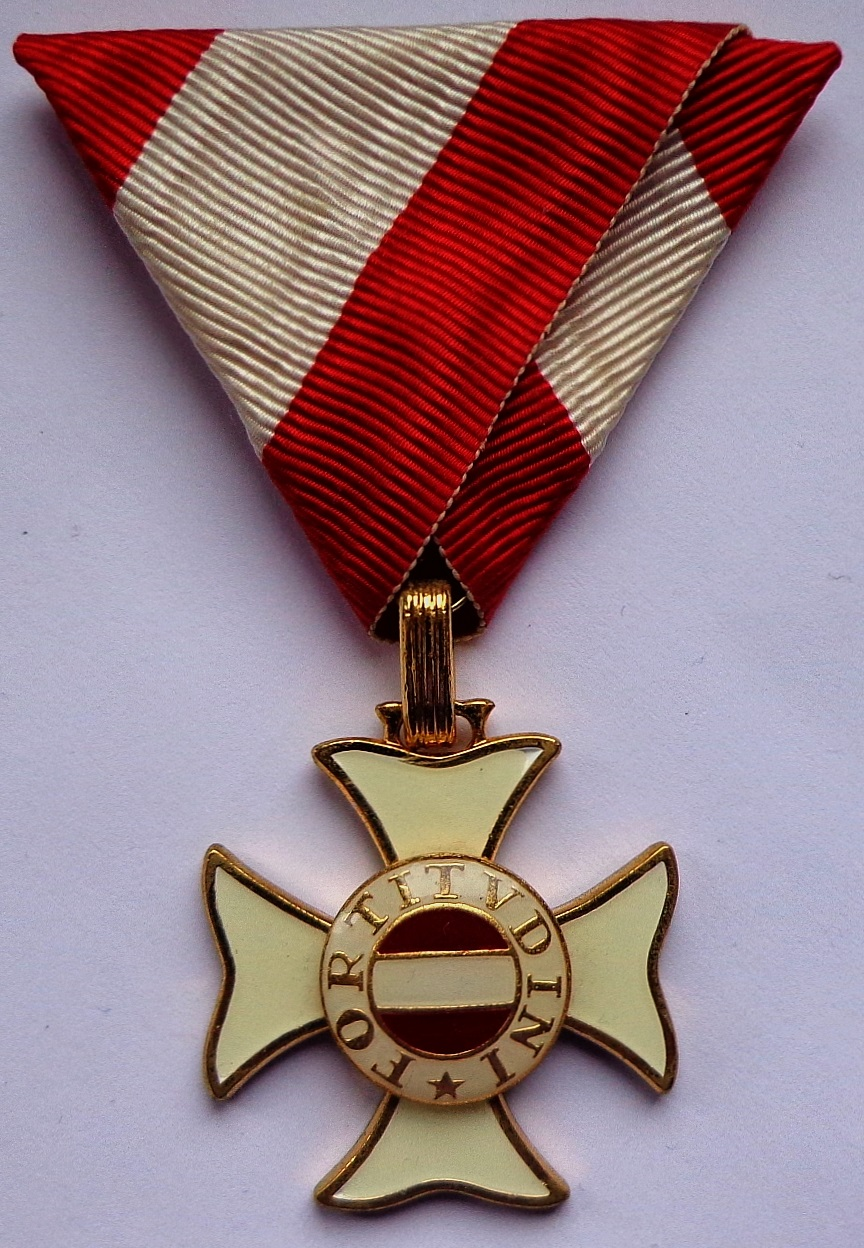
Knight's Cross (obverse)

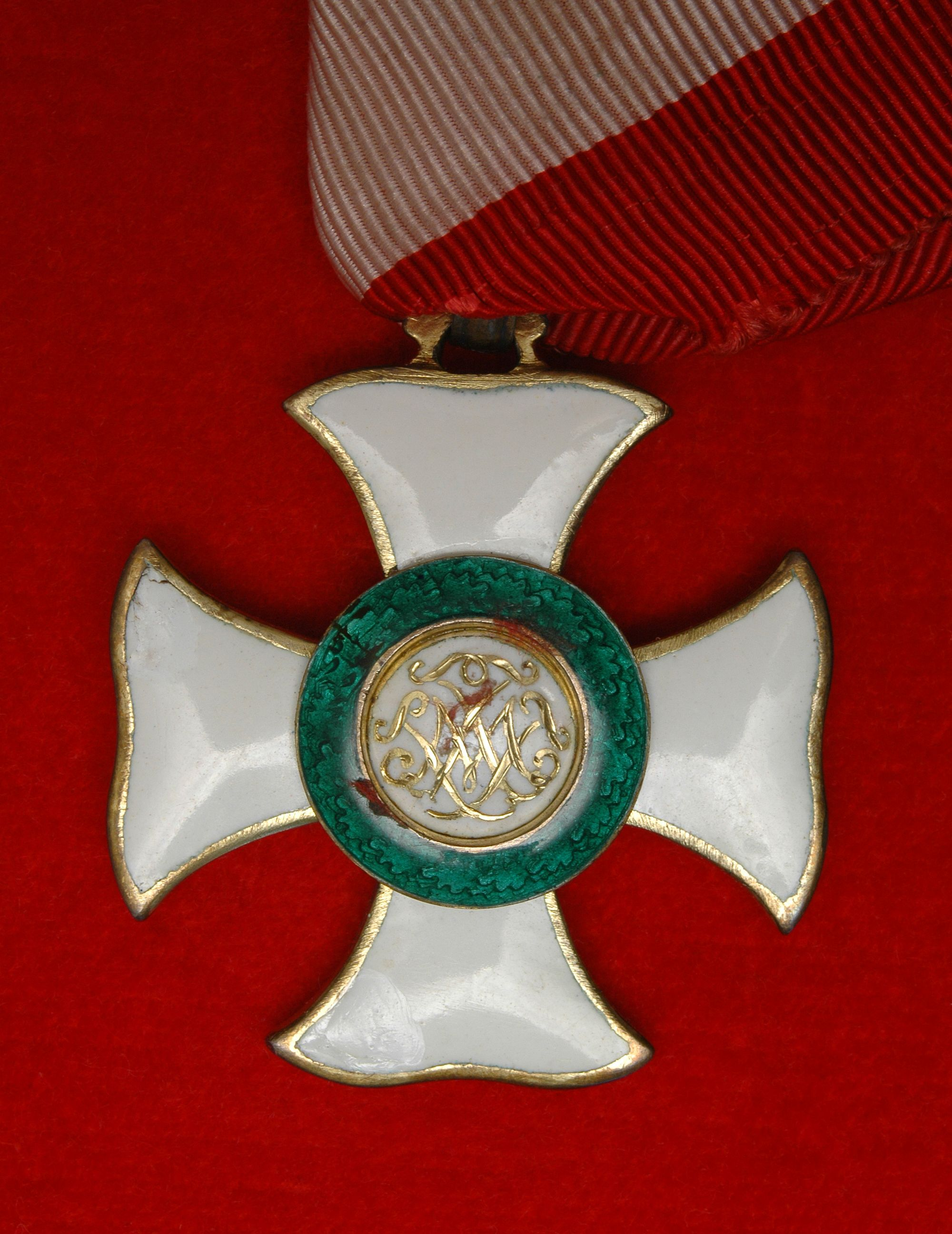
Reverse

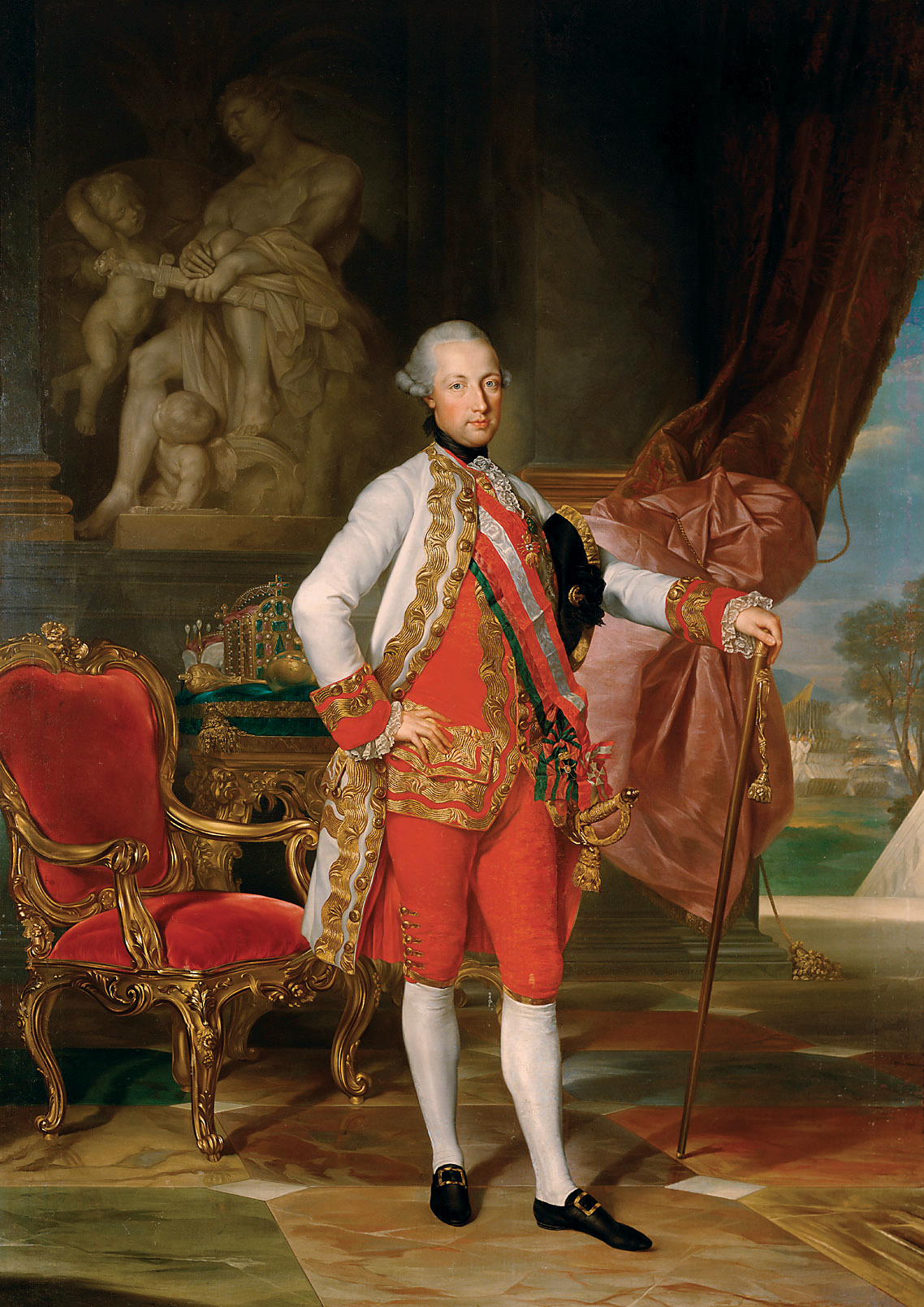
Joseph II wearing the ribbon of the order (portrait by Anton von Maron, 1775)

The Military Order of Maria Theresa (German: Militär-Maria-Theresien-Orden; Hungarian: Katonai Mária Terézia-rend; Czech: Vojenský řád Marie Terezie; Polish: Wojskowy Order Marii Teresy; Slovene: Vojaški red Marije Terezije; Croatian: Vojni red Marije Terezije) was the highest military honour of the Habsburg monarchy, Austrian Empire and Austro-Hungarian Empire.

== History ==
Founded on 18 June 1757, the day of the Battle of Kolín, by the Empress Maria Theresa, the honour was to reward especially meritorious and valorous acts by commissioned officers, including and especially the courageous act of defeating an enemy, and thus "serving" their monarch. It was specifically given for "successful military acts of essential impact to a campaign that were undertaken on [the officer's] own initiative, and might have been omitted by an honorable officer without reproach." This gave rise to a popular myth that it was awarded for (successfully) acting against an explicit order. It is considered to be the highest honour for a soldier in the Austrian armed services.

Originally, the order had two classes: the Knight's Cross and the Grand Cross. On 15 October 1765, Emperor Joseph II added a Commander's Cross, and a breast star to be worn by holders of the Grand Cross.

Prospective recipients were considered only in regard to their military service records; their ethnicity, birth and rank (as long as they were commissioned officers) were irrelevant. Knight's Cross recipients were automatically ennobled with the title of Ritter in the Austrian nobility for life, and admitted to court. Upon further petition, they could claim the hereditary title of Baron (Freiherr). They were also entitled to a pension. Widows of the order's recipients were entitled to half of their spouse's pension during the remainder of their lives.

The order ceased to be awarded by the Austrian emperor on the fall of the Habsburg dynasty in 1918, when its last sovereign, Charles I, transferred his powers concerning this honour to the Order Chapter. The Chapter then processed applications until its last meeting in 1931, when it was decided that further awards should not be made. Membership of the order was awarded a total of 1241 times. Alois Windisch and Friedrich Franek were the only two men who were awarded both the Knight's Cross of the Military Order of Maria Theresa and the German Knight's Cross of the Iron Cross.

On 4 November 1938, it was decided in Hungary to award further decorations of the order, citing legal continuity as long as Hungary's royal powers were exercised by the Regent Miklós Horthy; the Regent performed the duties of the Order's Grand Master in Hungary. During World War II, only one person received the Knight's Cross of the Order of Maria Theresa: Major General Kornél Oszlányi, commanding officer of the Royal Hungarian Army's 9th Light Infantry Division, for the battles at the river Don near Voronezh.

The last surviving knight of the Order was k.u.k. Fregattenleutnant Gottfried von Banfield. He received the honour in 1917 for his services as a maritime aviator during World War I, and he headed the Tripcovich Shipping Company in Trieste after the war. He died in 1986, aged ninety-six.

== Insignia ==
- The badge of the order was a gilt, white-enamelled cross. The central disc is also in enamel, bearing the coat-of-arms/national flag of Austria, surrounded by a white ring bearing the motto "Fortitudini" (For Courage).
- The star of the order was a silver faceted cross of the same shape as the badge, with a wreath of green-enameled oak leaves between the arms of the cross. The central disc is the same as the one on the badge.
- The ribbon of the order was red-white-red, from the national flag of Austria.

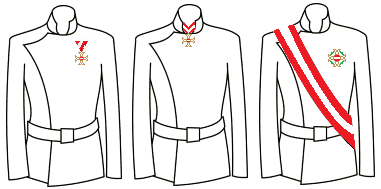

== Notable recipients of the Order ==
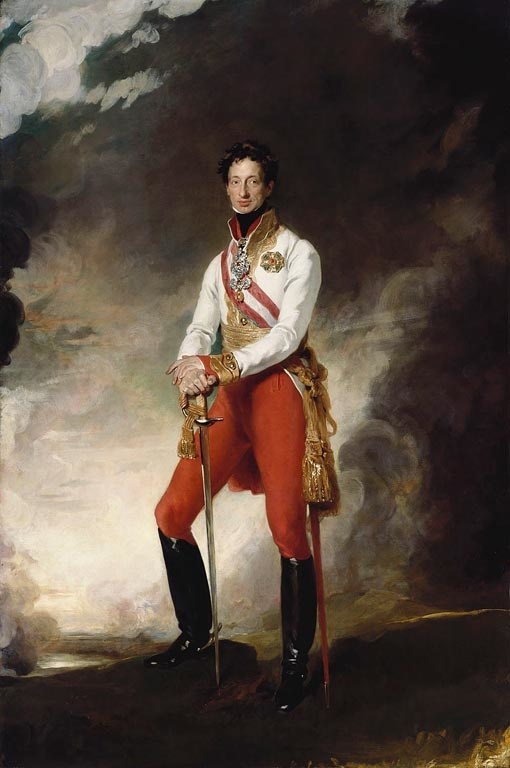
Portrait of Archduke Charles by Thomas Lawrence, 1819

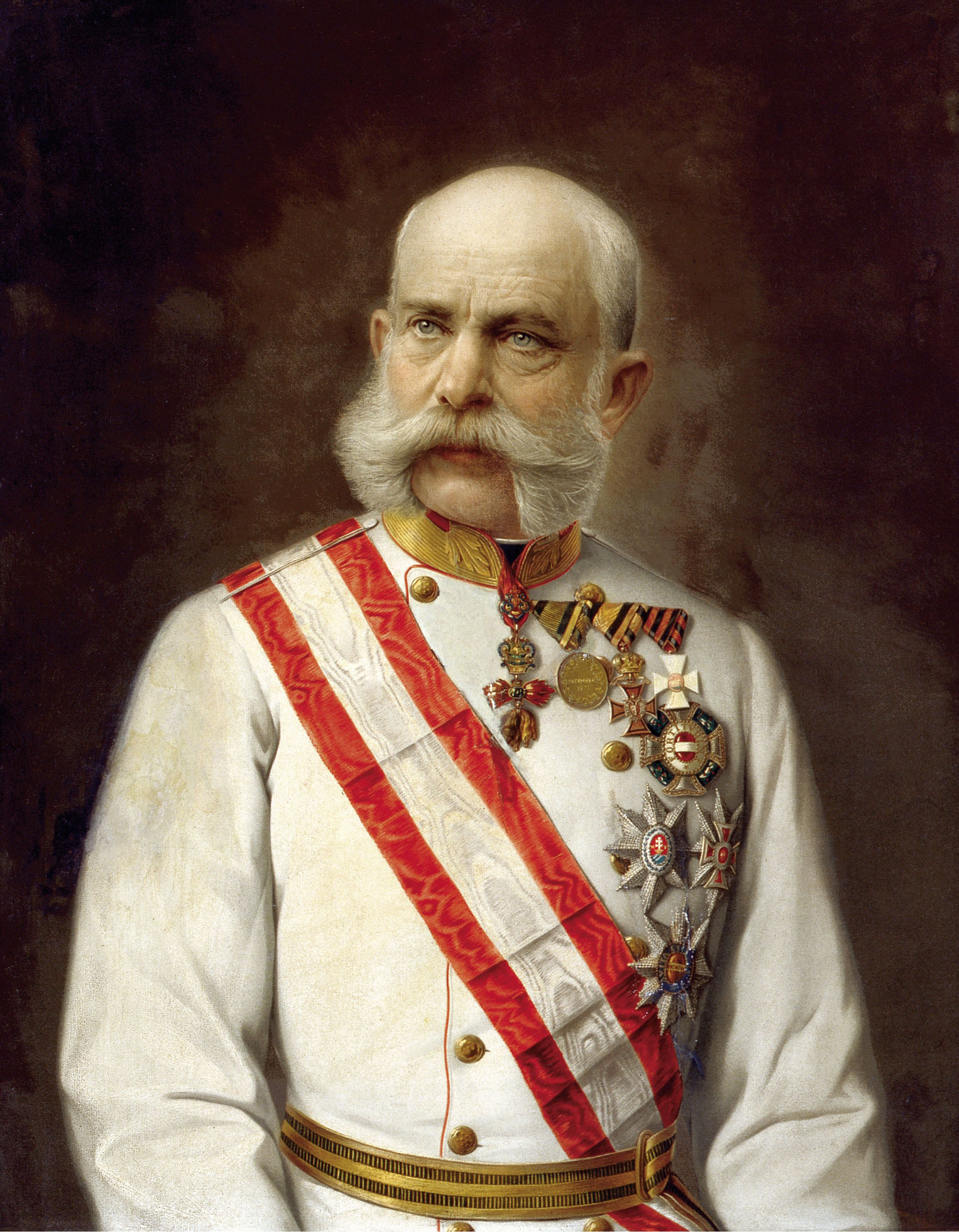
Franz Josef I wearing the Grand Cross sash and star

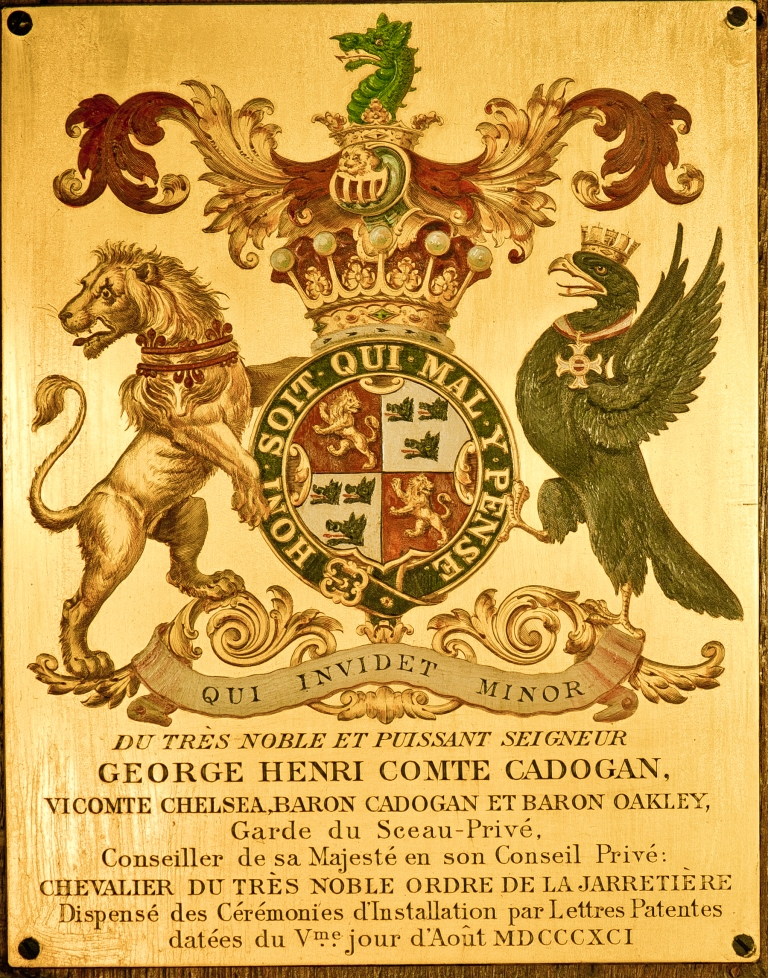
Cross of the Military Order of Maria Theresa in the arms of the Earls Cadogan, commemorating the services of the 3rd Earl

=== Grand Cross ===
- Field Marshal H.I.& A.M. Franz Joseph I, emperor and king of Austria-Hungary.
- Count Eduard Clam-Gallas (14 March 1805, Prague – 17 March 1891, Vienna) was an Austrian General.
- Count Leopold Joseph von Daun (or Dhaun) (24 September 1705 – 5 February 1766), later Prince of Thiano, Austrian field marshal, was born at Vienna, as son of Count Wirich Philipp von Daun.
- András Hadik de Futak (German: Andreas Reichsgraf Hadik von Futak; Hungarian: futaki Hadik András gróf; Slovak: Andrej Hadík; 16 October 1710 – 12 March 1790) was a Hungarian Count. He was commander of a Habsburg army corps in the Seven Years' War under Prince Charles Alexander of Lorraine.
- Paul von Hindenburg (2 October 1847 – 2 August 1934) was a German field marshal, statesman, and politician, and served as the second President of Germany from 1925 to 1934.
- Anton Ludwig August von Mackensen (6 December 1849 – 8 November 1945), born August Mackensen, was a German soldier and field marshal. He commanded with success during the First World War and became one of the German Empire's most prominent military leaders.
- Archduke John of Austria (German: Johann von Österreich; 20 January 1782 – 11 May 1859) was a member of the Habsburg dynasty, an Austrian field marshal and German Imperial regent (Reichsverweser).
- Johann Josef (Joseph) Wenzel (Anton Franz Karl) Graf Radetzky von Radetz (English: John Joseph Wenceslaus, Count Radetzky of Radetz, Czech: Jan Josef Václav hrabe Radecký z Radce) (Schloss Trebnitz; Czech: Trebnice), Bohemia, 2 November 1766 – Milan, Italy, 5 January 1858) was a Czech nobleman and Austrian general, immortalised by Johann Strauss I's Radetzky March. General Radetzky was in the military for over 70 years, until his death at age 91, and is known for the victories at the Battles of Custoza (24–25 July 1848) and Novara (23 March 1849) during the First Italian War of Independence.
- H.I.&.R.M. Wilhelm II, German Emperor (German: Friedrich Wilhelm Viktor Albrecht; English: Frederick William Victor Albert) (27 January 1859 – 4 June 1941) was the last German emperor and king of Prussia.

=== Commander's Cross ===
- Feldmarschall Johann Karl, Graf von Kolowrat-Krakowsky (21 December 1748 – 5 June 1816) was an Austrian Field Marshal general who fought against Napoleon and also was the last governor of the Kingdom of Serbia in 1791.
- Feldmarschalleutnant Emanuel Cvjetićanin (b. 8 August 1833). In the war of 1878–1882, Cvjetićanin was the main organizer of the gendarmerie in Sarajevo. He received numerous decorations, including the Order of Maria Theresa, and the title of baron. He was the first adjutant of Emperor Franz Josef I.
- Count Eduard Clam-Gallas (14 March 1805, Prague – 17 March 1891, Vienna) was an Austrian General.
- Svetozar Boroević (or Borojević) von Bojna (13 December 1856 – 23 May 1920) was an Orthodox Croat Austro-Hungarian Field Marshal during World War I.
- Eduard von Böhm-Ermolli (12 February 1856 – 9 December 1941) was an Austrian general during World War I.
- Friedrich Wilhelm Freiherr von Bülow, Graf von Dennewitz (16 February 1755 – 25 February 1816) was a Prussian general of the Napoleonic Wars.
- Count Viktor Dankl von Krasnik (German: Viktor Graf Dankl von Krasnik, born as Viktor Dankl on 18 September 1854, in Udine, died 8 January 1941 in Innsbruck) was a highly decorated career Austro-Hungarian officer who reached the pinnacle of his service during World War I with promotion to the rare rank of Colonel General (Generaloberst).
- Anton Haus (13 June 1851 – 8 February 1917) was an Austrian naval officer.
- Julius Jacob von Haynau (14 October 1786, Kassel – 14 March 1853) was an Austrian general.
- Heinrich Hermann Josef Freiherr von Heß (1788, Vienna – 1870, Vienna), Austrian soldier, entered the army in 1805.
- Count Josip Jelačić von Bužim (16 October 1801, Peterwaradein – 20 May 1859, Zagreb); also spelled Jellachich, Jellacic or Jellasics) was the Ban of Croatia between 23 March 1848 and 19 May 1859.
- Archduke Joseph August Viktor Klemens Maria of Austria, Prince of Hungary and Bohemia (9 August 1872 – 6 July 1962) was for a short period head of state of Hungary, a member of the House of Habsburg-Lorraine and the eldest son of Archduke Joseph Karl of Austria (1833–1905)
- Hermann Kövess von Kövessháza (30 March 1854 – 22 September 1924) was the final, and completely ceremonial, Commander-in-Chief of Austria-Hungary. He served as a generally competent and unremarkable commander in the Austro-Hungarian Army and was close to retirement in 1914 when The First World War broke out and he was given a command post.
- Laval Graf Nugent von Westmeath (Ballynacor, Ireland, 3 November 1777 – Karlovac, Croatia, 21 August 1862) was a soldier of Irish birth who fought in the armies of Austria and the Two Sicilies.
- Arthur Freiherr Arz von Straussenburg (or Straußenburg) 16 June 1857 – 1 June 1935, was an Austro-Hungarian Colonel-General and last Chief of General Staff to the Austro-Hungarian Army.
- Henry Paget, 1st Marquess of Anglesey (17 May 1768 – 29 April 1854), also known as Lord Uxbridge. Commanded the Cavalry Corps of the Anglo-Allied Army at the Battle of Waterloo on 18 June 1815.
- Rowland Hill, 1st Viscount Hill (11 August 1772 – 10 December 1842), Lord Hill commanded the II Corps of the Anglo-Allied Army at Waterloo.

=== Knight’s Cross ===
- Feldmarschalleutnant Emanuel Cvjetićanin (8 August 1833). In the war of 1878–1882, Cvjetićanin was the main organizer of the gendarmerie in Sarajevo. He received numerous decorations, including the Order of Maria Theresa, and the title of baron. He was the first adjutant of Emperor Franz Josef I.
- Karl Baron von Urban (31 August 1802 - 1 January 1877) was a Feldmarschall-leutnant who distinguished himself in the fight for unity and survival of the Austrian Empire during the Years of Revolutions in 1848-49, as well as at the Second Sardinian War, adopting in both occasions tactics of high mobility against stronger forces - Promotion CLIII on 6 February 1849.
- Count Eduard Clam-Gallas (14 March 1805 in Prague – 17 March 1891 in Vienna) was an Austrian General.
- Major-General Sir Robert Henry Dick, KCB, KCH – 73rd Foot – died of wounds, 10 February 1846.
- Sir John Elley, British officer in the Napoleonic Wars.
- Karl Freiherr Mack von Leiberich (25 August 1752 – 22 December 1828) was an Austrian soldier. He is best remembered as the commander of the Austrian forces defeated and captured by Napoleon's Grande Armée in the Battle of Ulm in 1805.
- Tadeusz Rozwadowski, known in Austria as Thaddäus Ritter (later Count, after his father's death) Jordan-Rozwadowski von Groß-Rozwadów,(19 May 1866 – 18 October 1928) was a Polish military commander, diplomat, and politician, a general of the Austro-Hungarian Army and then the Polish Army. His family came from Lwow, Galicia, the part of Poland ruled by Austria-Hungary. He was a Feldmarschall-Leutnant and became the commanding officer of the 43rd Infantry Division, which he led during the victorious battle of Gorlice. After World War I he was one of the founders of the modern Polish State and Army and is credited as one of the victors of the Battle of Warsaw (1920).
- Korvettenkapitän Georg Ludwig von Trapp. Father of the famous Von Trapp family that inspired the movie The Sound of Music. He was awarded the order for becoming "the dread of the Adriatic" for sinking 13 ships as a submarine commander during the First World War. Born on 4 April 1880, he died of lung cancer in Vermont on 30 May 1947.
- Viktor Weber Edler von Webenau (* 13 November 1861 in Neuhaus; † 6 May 1932 in Innsbruck), General in the Austro-Hungarian army while World War I, military governor of Montenegro between 1916 and 1917 and head of the Austro-Hungarian armistice commission (Armistice of villa Giusti)
- Ferdinand, Freiherr of Wintzingerode (15 February 1770, Allendorf – 16 June 1818, Wiesbaden) was a German nobleman and officer in several different armies of the Napoleonic Wars, finally ending up as a general in the Imperial Russian army and fighting in the War of the Sixth Coalition against the French invasion of Russia and the subsequent campaigns in Germany and France. He appears in Tolstoy's War and Peace.
- Eugen Count Wratislaw von Mittrowitz-Nettolitzky (* 8 July 1786, in Wischopol (Czech: Dolní Bousov), Bohemia; † 14 February 1867, in Vienna) was an Austrian Fieldmarshal.
- Maximilian Daublebsky Freiherr von Sterneck zu Ehrenstein (14 February 1829, Klagenfurt – 5 December 1897, Vienna) was an Austrian admiral who served as the chief administrator of the Austro-Hungarian Navy from 1883 until his death.
- Feldmarschalleutnant Nikolaus Esterházy, Prince Esterházy of Galantha (18 December 1714 – 28 September 1790). Universally recognized for his patronage of the Austrian Composer Joseph Haydn. He received the Order upon his bravery in the Battle of Kolín
- Andreas O'Reilly von Ballinlough (3 August 1742 – 5 July 1832) was an Austrian soldier and military commander of Irish origin. His military service extended through the Seven Years' War, War of the Bavarian Succession, Austro-Turkish War, French Revolutionary Wars, and Napoleonic Wars. He retired from the army in 1810 and died at age 89.
- Johann Iskrić (3 March 1884 – 14 June 1961) who received the Knight's cross for his conduct and bravery in the Eleventh Battle of the Isonzo in the World War I.
- Josef Bartos (1889–1941) was a Czech commander of an Austrian Artillery unit that was surrounded by Czarist Russians after their offensive broke through Austrian lines in Galacia (c.1914), and successfully fought their way out of the encirclement.
- Miklós Horthy (18 June 1868 – 9 February 1957) was a Hungarian naval officer, commanding officer of the SMS Novara received the Knight's Cross in 186th promotion on 10 March 7, 1921. for the Battle of the Strait of Otranto.
- Oberleutnant IR.102 Theodor Wanke (25 Sept. 1887, Iglau – 10. August 1944, Hrvatska Kostajnica) who received the Knight's cross for his conduct and bravery in the 8th Battle of the Isonzo (October 1916)in the World War I. in 186th promotion on 10 March 1921
- Oberleutnant IR 102 Johan Fousek (1892–1980) who received the Knight's cross for his conduct and bravery in the 7th Battle of the Isonzo in the World War I. in March 1921
- Hauptmann IR 16 (originally IR 102) Gottlieb Vojáček who received the Knight's Cross for his conduct and bravery in the Battle near Dolina (1917) in the World War I. in 187th promotion on 10 June 1921
- Linienschiffskapitän Gottfried von Banfield, K.u.K. Kriegsmarine top ace in WW1, received the Knight's Cross of the Military Order of Maria Theresa on 17 August 1917. Banfield was the last surviving member of the Military Order, dying in 1986, 69 years after his medal was awarded.

== See also ==
- Order of Saint Stephen of Hungary
- Order of Franz Joseph
- Order of Leopold
- Order of St. George (Habsburg-Lorraine)
- Order of the Iron Crown
- Orders, decorations, and medals of Austria-Hungary
- Order of chivalry
