= Order of Saint Stephen of Hungary =

Order of knighthood founded in 1764

Order of Saint Stephen
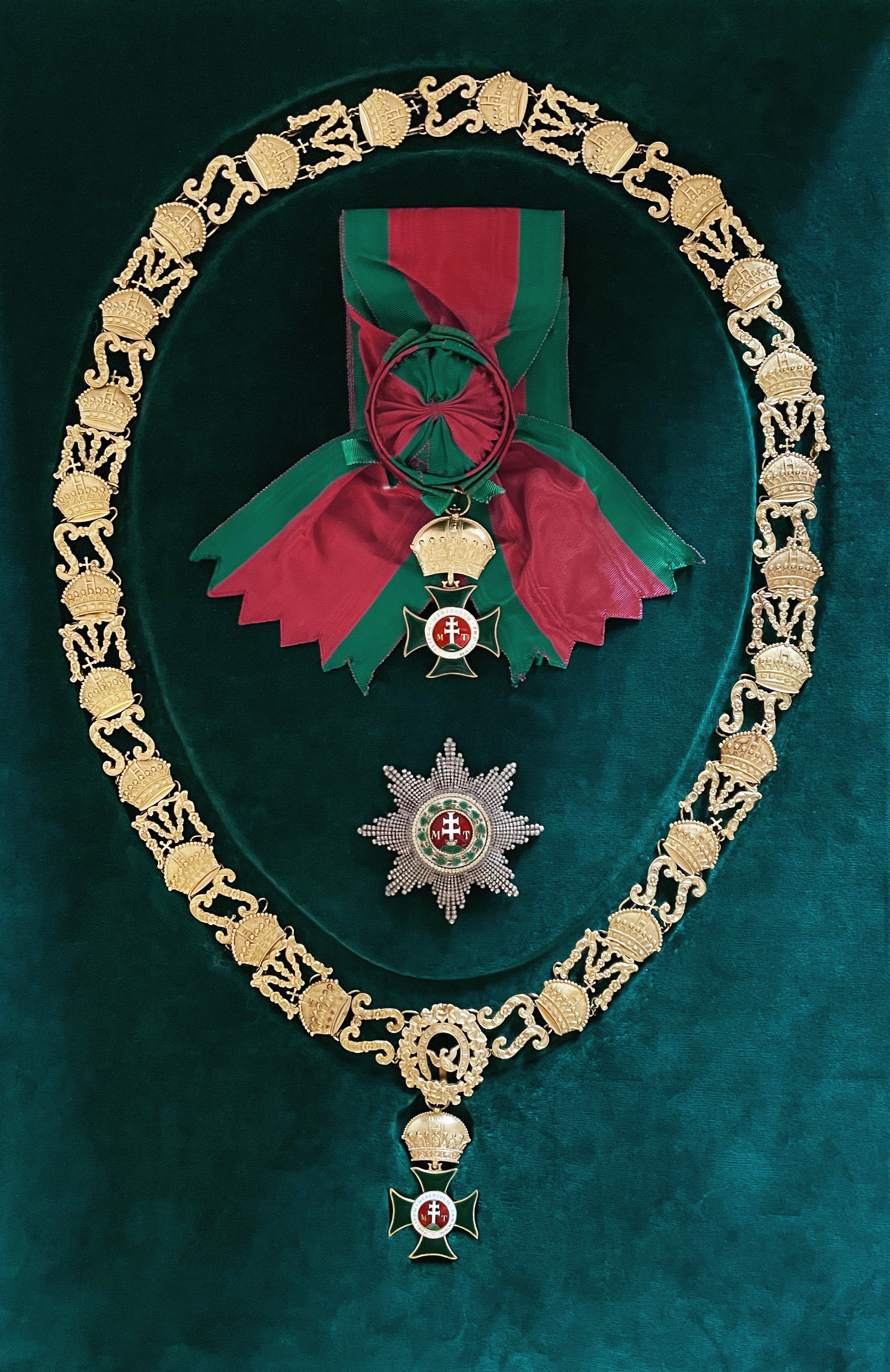
- Grand Cross insignia with Collar

Awarded by The Head of the House of Habsburg-Lorraine
- Type: Dynastic order
- Established: 1764
- Royal house: House of Habsburg-Lorraine
- Religious affiliation: Catholic
- Sovereign: Archduke Karl
- Grand Master: Archduke Georg
- Classes: Grand Cross; Commander; Knight

Precedence
- Next (higher): Military Order of Maria Theresa
- Next (lower): Order of Leopold (Austria)
- Ribbon of the order

The Order of Saint Stephen (Hungarian: Szent István rend) is an order of chivalry founded in 1764 by Maria Theresa. In 1938, Miklós Horthy took the rights and activities of Grand Master as Regent of Hungary. The name of the Order changed to the Royal Hungarian Order of Saint Stephen (German: Königlich Ungarischer Sankt-Stephans-Orden, Latin: Ordo Equitum Sancti Stephani Regis (Hungariae) Apostolici). The Order was terminated at the time of the proclamation of the Second Hungarian Republic in 1946. It was recreated in 2011 as the Hungarian Order of Saint Stephen, and to this day remains the highest order in Hungary.

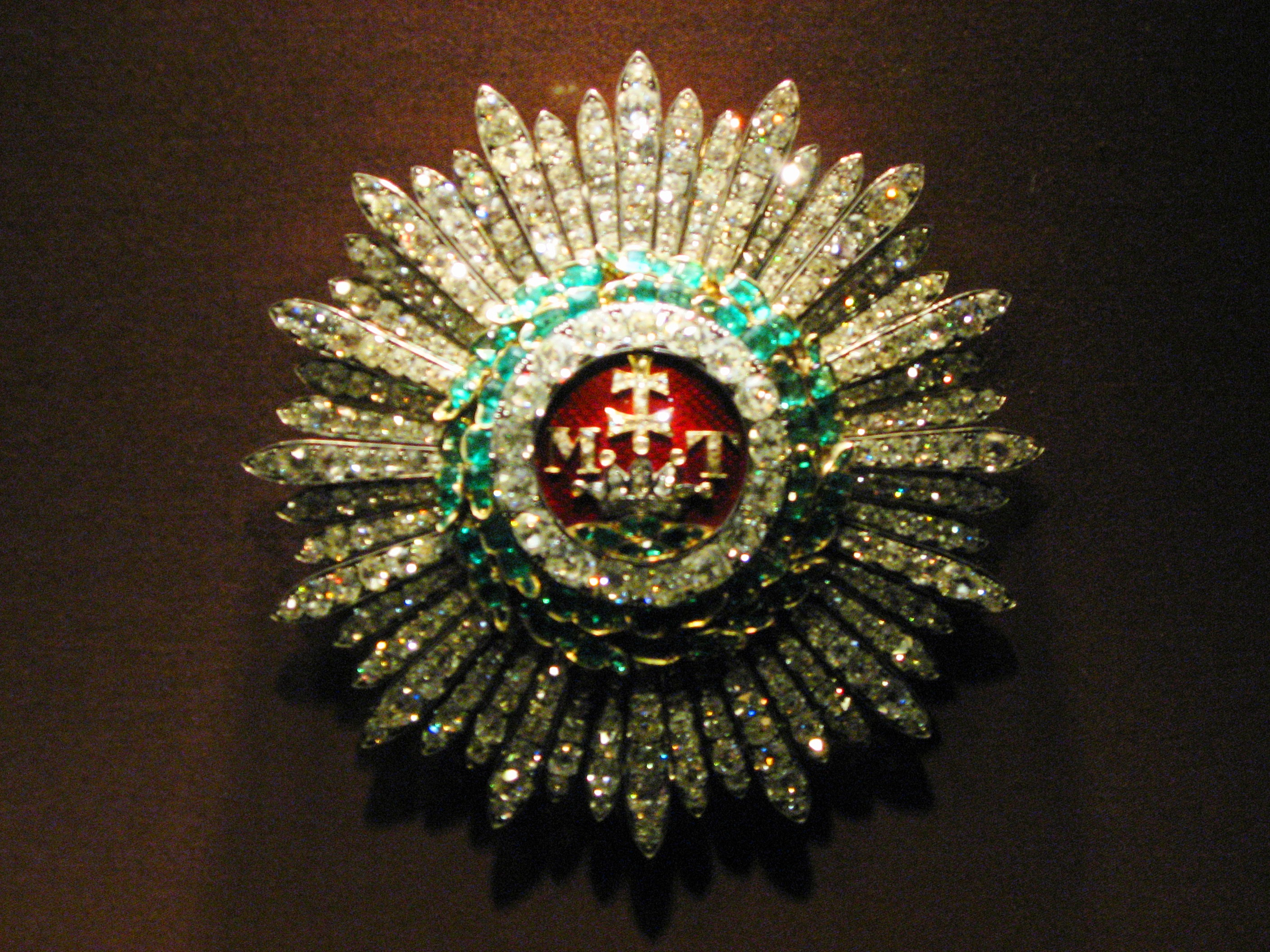
Royal Hungarian Order of Saint Stephen, Grand Cross

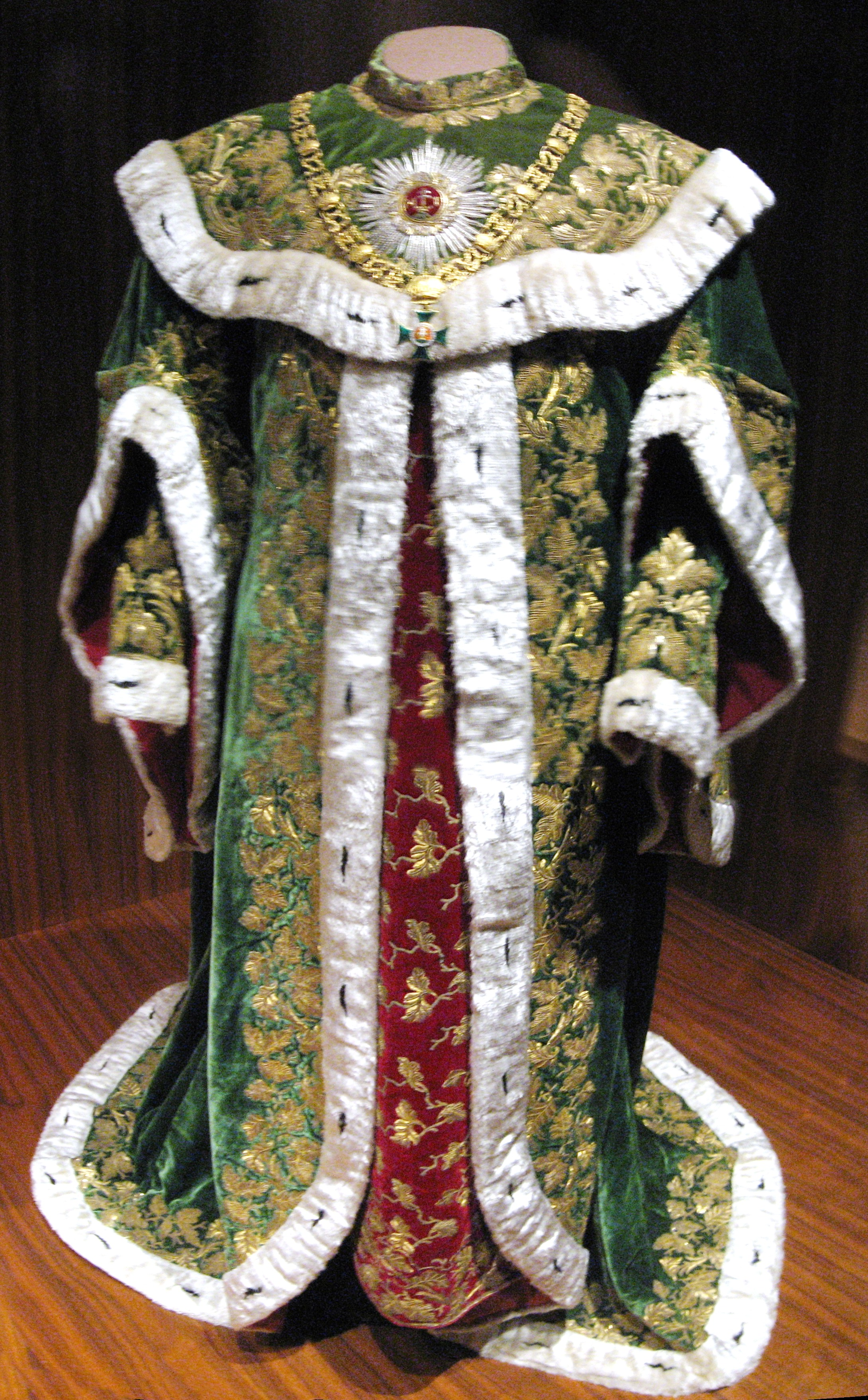
Cape and gown of a knight of the order

== Significance to Hungarians ==
The order is named after Hungary's most famous king, Stephen I, whose reign (997–1038) was marked by his consolidation of the monarchy, the establishment of the medieval state of Hungary, and his adoption of Christianity as the state religion. His coronation, as recognized in the Church, is dated 1001. He died August 15, 1038, during the Feast of the Assumption. His feast day in Hungary is August 20. Canonized by Pope Gregory VII in 1083 along with his son Imre (who preceded him in death in 1031, after a hunting accident) and Bishop Gerhard of Hungary, St. Stephen is the patron saint of "Hungary, kings, the death of children, masons, stonecutters, and bricklayers." Though its exact provenance is somewhat disputed, the Crown of St. Stephen is said to have been a gift from Pope Silvester II, upon Stephen's 1001 coronation.

== Creation and qualifications for membership ==
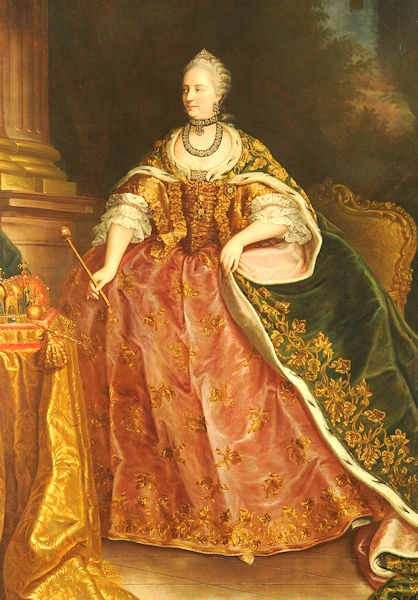
Maria Theresa, founder of the Order and first Grand Master, wearing the robes of the Order

Grand Cross breast star

Empress Maria Theresa and her son, Emperor Joseph II, made several political concessions to ease tensions within their empire—most especially between Austria and Hungary, among them being the creation of the Order. Membership was available to various members of the Hungarian nobility. To receive the Order, according to collector and historian Stephen Herold,

one had to have at least four quarterings of arms showing as many generations of noble status. It helped promote her (Maria Theresa's) position as Queen of Hungary and reinforced the quasi independent position of Hungary in the Empire. The original statutes allow for only 20 Grand Crosses, 30 Commanders and 50 Knights who are to be "distinguished for virtue and merit and noble birth". Grand Cross Knights were considered so important that the Emperor was to address them as "Cousin". These insignia were to be returned to the Chancellery of the Order on the death of the holder. There was no military application of this order. It is rare, and even modern awards of St. Stephen are seldom seen. Perhaps more than any other Austrian order, this one approached the ideal character as put forth in its statutes and regulations.

== Insignia ==
Grand Cross
For ceremonial purposes, a full set of robes were prescribed, following the tradition of other orders, such as the Austrian and Spanish Orders of the Golden Fleece and Great Britain's Order of the Garter. The robes were crimson and green, and were lined with ermine. A collar of gold was worn about the neck and shoulders, with the badge of the Order suspended from the collar. For normal occasions and every-day wear, a sash of crimson, edged with green, was worn over the right shoulder and extended to the left hip, the distinctive badge of the Order suspended from the sash at the hip. An eight-pointed star was worn on the left breast. During the waning days of the monarchy, especially during the Great War, a less formal option was also authorized, whereby a miniature (a so-called “kleine Decoration”) of the breast star was affixed to the center of the ribbon of an ordinary knight's cross, and was worn on the left breast with other orders and military medals, in order of precedence.
Commanders
Wore the badge of the Order at the throat, suspended from the crimson edged with green ribbon about the neck. During the Great War, the informal wear of the miniature, gold, Crown of Saint Stephen kleine Decoration was worn on an ordinary knight's cross, to delineate them from ordinary knights and Grand Cross knights, and worn on the left breast with other orders and military medals, in order of precedence.
Knights
Wore the badge of the Order, suspended from a tri-fold ribbon of crimson, edged in green, on the left breast with other orders and military medals, in order of precedence.

== List of members ==
=== Grand Masters ===
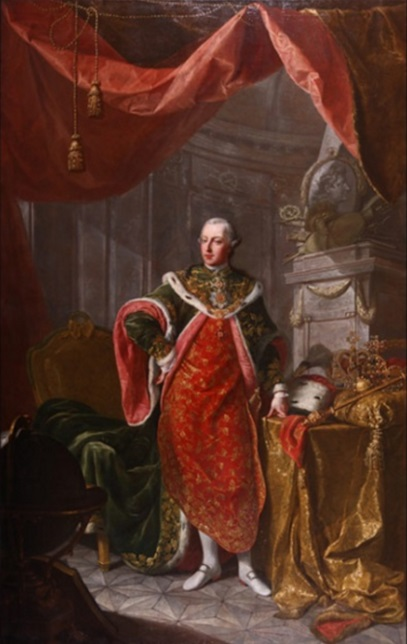
Josef II, second Grand Master, wearing the robes of the Order

Emperor Franz I of Austria, fourth Grand Master, wearing the robes of the Order

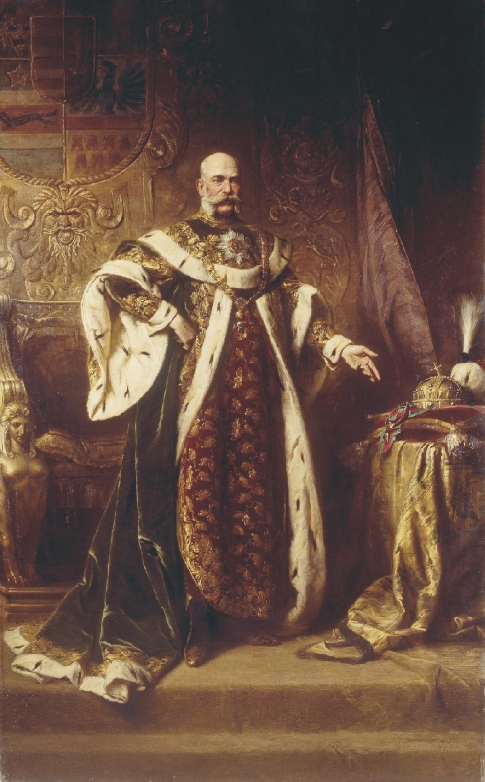
Emperor Franz Josef I of Austria-Hungary, sixth Grand Master, wearing the robes of the Order

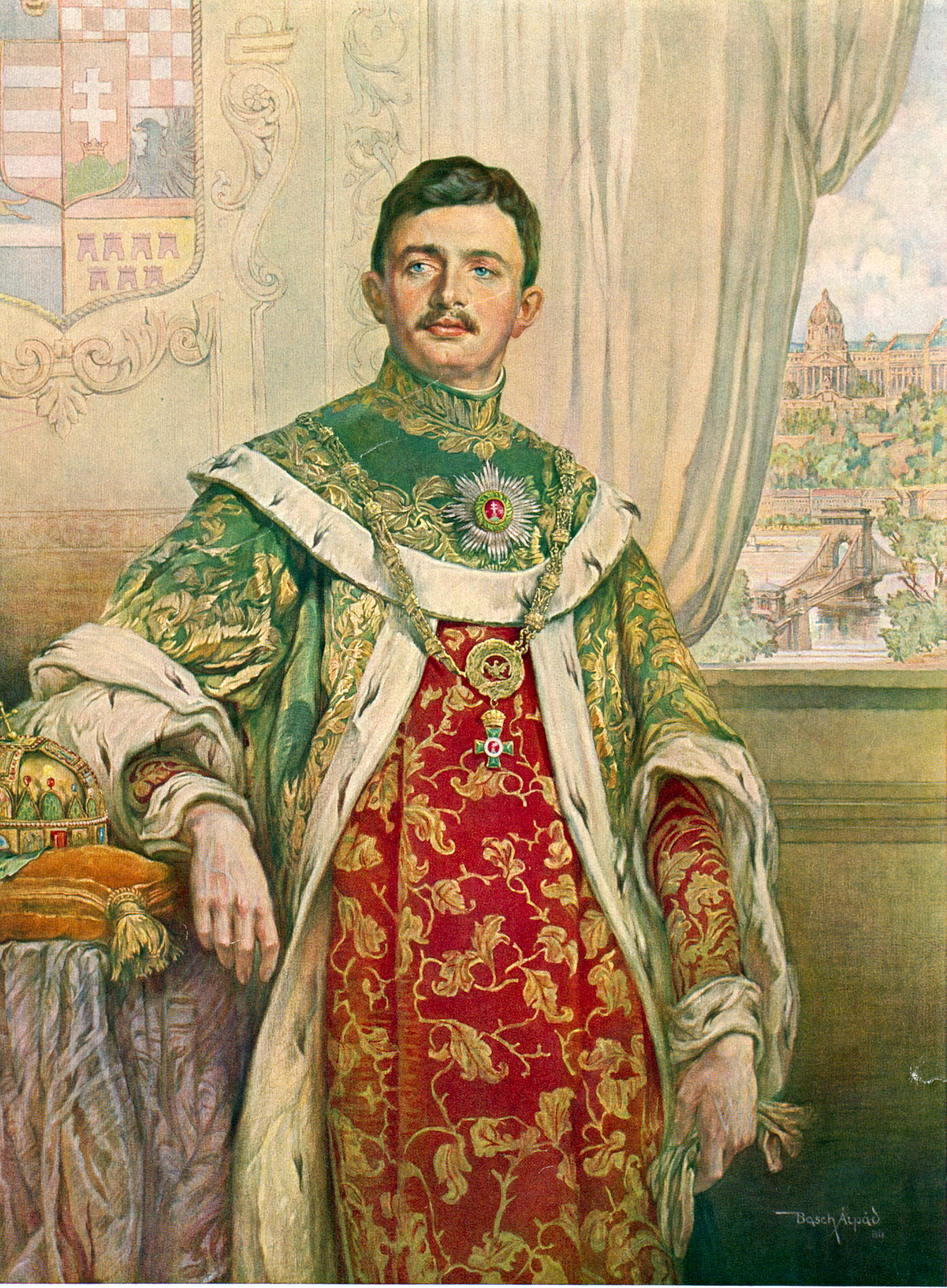
Emperor Charles I of Austria-Hungary, seventh Grand Master, wearing the robes of the Order

- Empress Maria Theresa (May 13, 1717 – November 29, 1780), 1764–1780
- Emperor Josef II (March 13, 1741 – February 20, 1790), 1780–1790
- Emperor Leopold II (May 5, 1747 – March 1, 1792), 1790–1792
- Emperor Franz I (II) (12 February 1768 – 2 March 1835), 1792–1835
- Emperor Ferdinand I (April 19, 1793 – June 29, 1875), 1835–1848
- Emperor Franz Josef I (August 18, 1830 – November 21, 1916), 1848–1916
- Emperor Karl I (17 August 1887 – 1 April 1922), 1916–1922; deposed as emperor and king as a result of World War One, but never abdicated; received beatification ("Blessed Charles I") by Pope John Paul II, 2004
- Vitéz Miklós Horthy (18 June 1868 – 9 February 1957), 1938–1944
- Otto von Habsburg (20 November 1912 – 4 July 2011); stepped down from his role as head of the House of Habsburg in January 2007, in favor of his son Karl.
- Karl von Habsburg (born 11 January 1961), 2007–present

== Order of St. Stephen – Kingdom of Hungary (1764–1918) ==
=== Knights, Grand Cross ===
- Prince Wenzel Anton von Kaunitz ( In Czech: Václav Antonin Kounic; 1711 – 1794), diplomat and foreign policy advisor to Maria Theresa, State Chancellor and Privy Councilor to Josef II
- Carl Friedrich Hatzfeldt zu Gleichen (September 14, 1718 – September 5, 1793), Austrian statesman; invested with the Grand Cross of the Royal Hungarian Order of Saint Stephen, May 6, 1764
- Prince Anton Esterházy de Galantha (11 April 1738 – 22 January 1794), Captain of the Hungarian Life Guards; also a member of the Order of the Golden Fleece; son of Field Marshal Prince Nicholas ("Miklós" in Hungarian) Esterházy, the primary patron of Joseph Haydn; nephew of Field Marshal Pal II Antal Esterházy
- Archduke Ferdinand of Austria-Este (1 June 1754 – 24 December 1806), fourth son of Emperor Franz I Stephen and Empress Maria Theresa; heir presumptive of the Duchy of Modena
- Archduke Maximilian Franz of Austria (1756–1801), fifth son of Emperor Franz I Stephen and Empress Maria Theresa; Grand Master of the Teutonic Order; Archbishop and Elector of Cologne
- Albert, Duke of Saxony-Teschen (11 July 1738 – 10 February 1822), husband of Archduchess Maria Christine, son-in-law of Emperor Franz I Stephen and Empress Maria Theresa, and brother-in-law of Emperors Joseph II and Leopold II
- Field Marshal Karl Josef gróf Batthyany (28. April 1697 – 15. April 1772), Field Marshal of Hungary
- Samuel von Brukenthal (1721–1803), Governor of Transylvania, personal advisor of Empress Maria Theresa.
- Ferdinand III, Grand Duke of Tuscany (May 6, 1769 – June 18, 1824), second son of Emperor Leopold II
- Archduke Charles, Duke of Teschen (September 5, 1771 – April 30, 1847), third son of Emperor Leopold II; Field Marshal of Austria
- Archduke Alexander Leopold of Austria (August 14, 1772 – July 12, 1795), fourth son of Emperor Leopold II; Palatine/Regent of Hungary
- Archduke Joseph, Palatine of Hungary (9 March 1776 – 13 January 1847), fifth son of Emperor Leopold II
- Archduke Johann of Austria (January 20, 1782 – May 11, 1859), sixth son of Emperor Leopold II; Regent of the Duchy of Styria, naturalist, industrialist
- Archduke Rainer of Austria (30 September 1783 – 16 January 1853), seventh son of Emperor Leopold II; Viceroy of the Kingdom of Lombardy–Venetia
- Archduke Louis of Austria (13 December 1784 – 21 December 1864), eighth son of Emperor Leopold II; Field Marshal of Austria; head of the State Conference (Regency) for Emperor Ferdinand

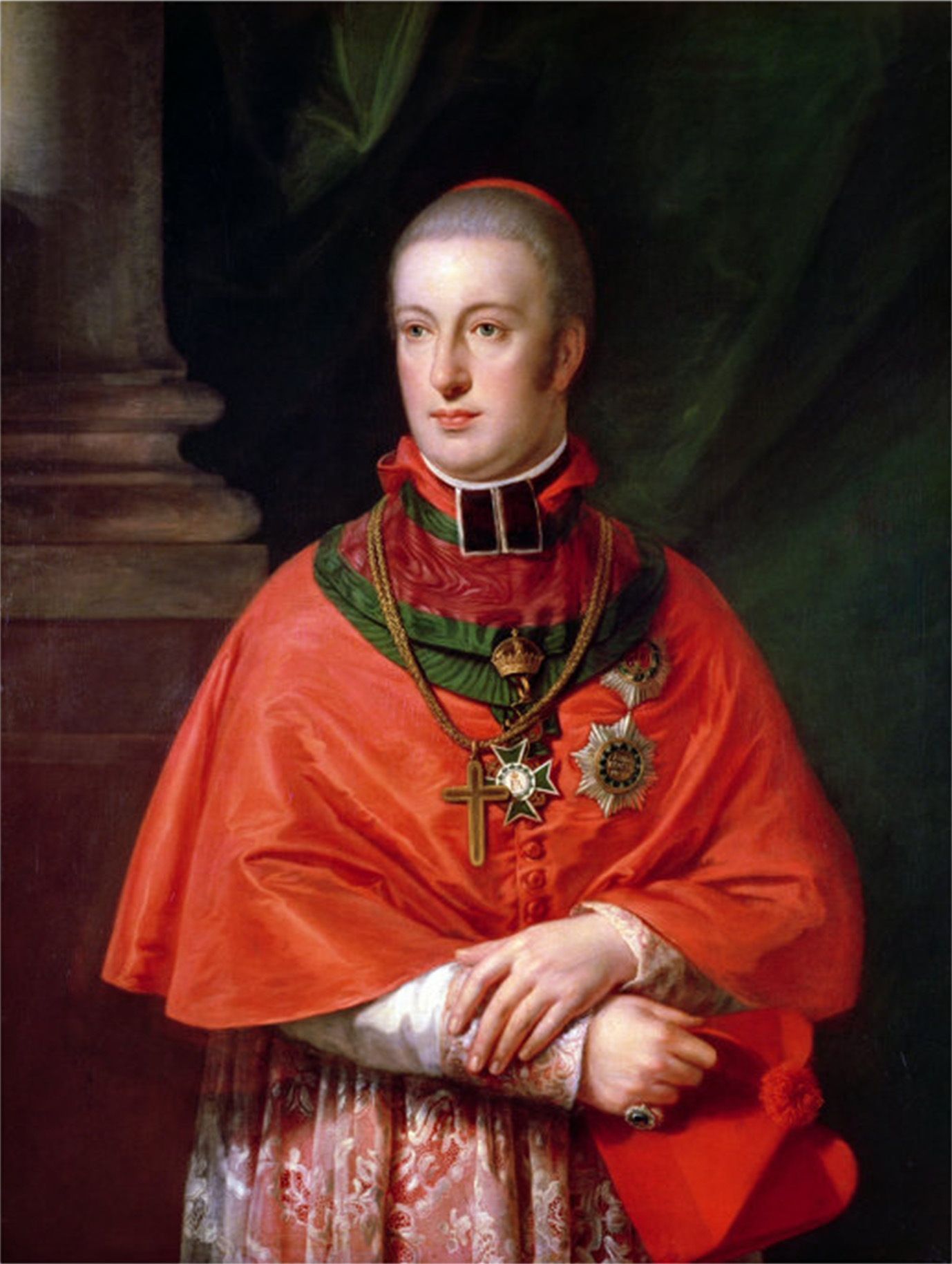
Cardinal Rudolf, Archduke of Austria, wearing a variant of the Grand Cross insignia on his clerical robes

- Archduke Rudolf of Austria (January 8, 1788 – 24 July 1831), ninth son of Emperor Leopold II; Archbishop of Olomouc; Cardinal in the Catholic Church, from June 4, 1819
- Field Marshal Karl Phillip Fürst zu Schwarzenberg (April 18, 1771 – October 15, 1820), Field Marshal of Austria and Commander in Chief of the Army of Bohemia during the Napoleonic Wars.
- Field Marshal Alfred Fürst zu Windisch-Graetz (May 11, 1787 – March 21, 1862), Field Marshal of Austria and chief commander of Austrian forces during the Hungarian Revolt, 1849
- Field Marshal Heinrich Hermann Josef Freiherr von Heß (1788–1870), Field Marshal of Austria and Chief of Staff to Emperor Franz Josef
- Friedrich Ferdinand graf von Beust (January 13, 1809 – October 24, 1886), Minister of Foreign Affairs, Kingdom of Saxony; later Privy Councilor to Franz Josef after assisting him in gaining the throne in Hungary;
- Archduke Albert, Duke of Teschen (August 3, 1817 – February 2, 1895), son of Archduke Charles; Field Marshal of Austria; Governor of Hungary
- Archduke Franz Karl of Austria (7 December 1802 – 8 March 1878), second son of Emperor Franz I (II) and younger brother of Emperor Ferdinand; Member of the State Conference (Regency) for his older brother, Emperor Ferdinand; father of Emperor Franz Josef of Austria-Hungary and Emperor Maximilian of Mexico

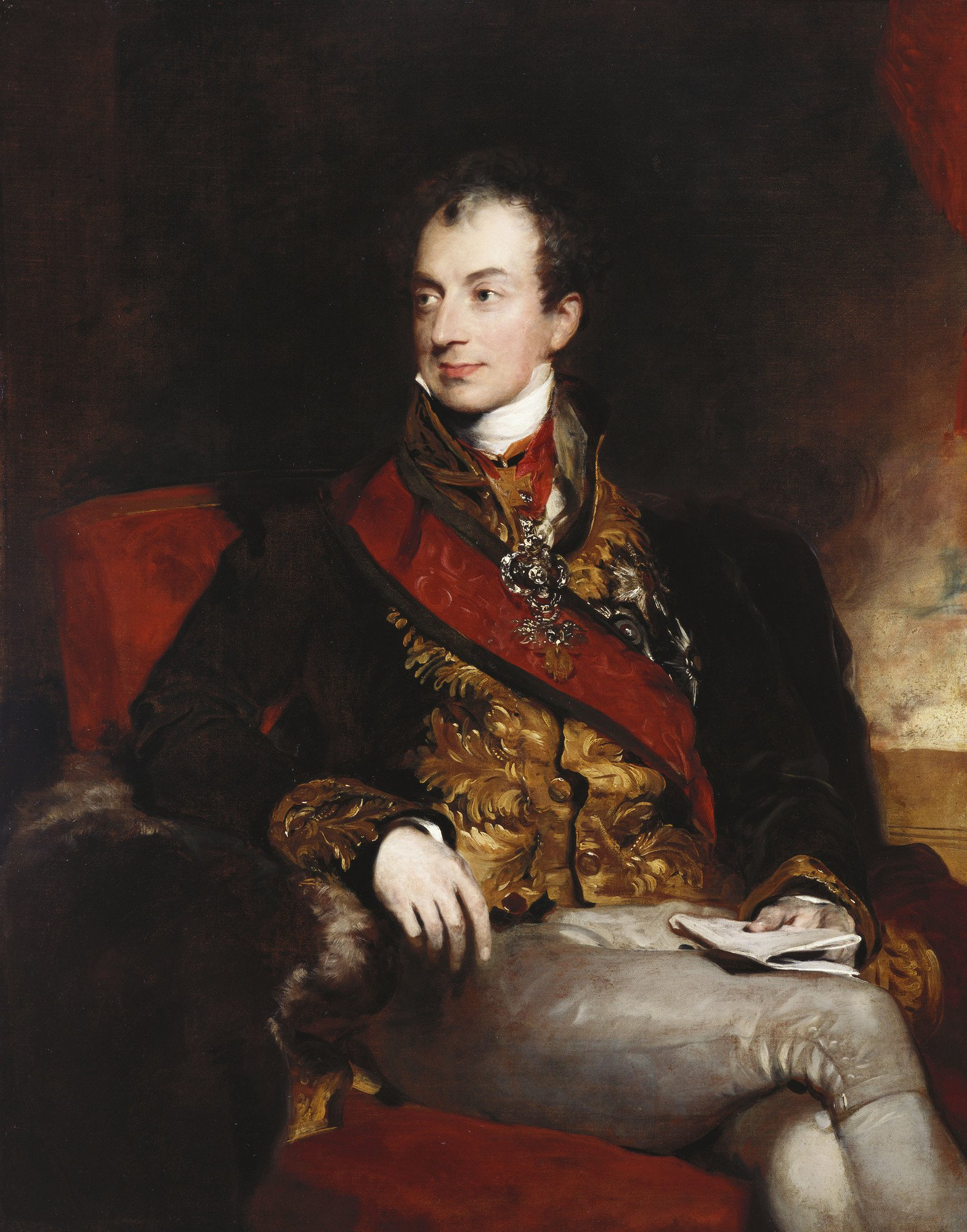
Prince Metternich, the Minister of State, wearing the Grand Cross sash and star on his court uniform. Portrait by Sir Thomas Lawrence

- Prince Klemens Wenzel von Metternich (May 15, 1773 – June 11, 1859), Minister of State, statesman and diplomat
- Napoleon II of France (March 20, 1811 – July 22, 1832), King of Rome, titular Emperor of the French, and Duke of Reichstadt; son of Emperor Napoleon Bonaparte of the French, and his second wife, Archduchess Maria Luisa of Austria
- Count Alfred Josef Potocki (1817 – May 15, 1889), Member of the Austrian House of Peers and the Galician Diet; Vieceroy of Galicia, Minister-president (prime minister) of Austria, 1870 – 1871
- Franjo (Francis) Haller of Hallerkeö (1796–1875), “Ban” (Viceroy) of Croatia, June 16, 1842 – 1845
- Count Gyula Andrássy de Csíkszentkirály et Krasznahorka (in Hungarian: csíkszentkirályi és krasznahorkai gróf Andrássy Gyula) (March 3, 1823 – February 18, 1890), Hungarian statesman and diplomat; first constitutional Premier of Hungary
- Emperor Maximilian of Mexico (July 6, 1832 – June 19, 1867), Archduke of Austria and Prince of Hungary and Bohemia; second son of Archduke Franz Karl; brother of Emperor Franz Josef I of Austria-Hungary
- Archduke Joseph Karl of Austria (2 March 1833 – 13 June 1905), second son of Archduke Joseph (Palatine of Hungary); General der Kavalrie in the Austro-Hungarian Army (K.u.K.)
- Archduke Karl Ludwig of Austria (30 July 1833 – 19 May 1896), third son of Archduke Franz Karl; brother of Emperor Franz Josef of Austria-Hungary and Emperor Maximilian of Mexico; father of Archduke Franz Ferdinand; grandfather of Emperor Karl I of Austria-Hungary
- Field Marshal Alexander von Krobatin (1849–1933); Field Marshal of Austria-Hungary
- Field Marshal Hermann Kövess von Kövessháza (1854–1924); Field Marshal of Austria-Hungary; invested with the Grand Cross of the Royal Hungarian Order of St. Stephen, 26 March 1918
- Field Marshal Eduard von Böhm-Ermolli (February 12, 1856 – December 9, 1941), Field Marshal of Austria-Hungary; honorary Army General of Czechoslovakia, 1928; honorary Generalfeldmarschall of Germany, 1938
- Archduke Friedrich, Duke of Teschen (4 June 1856, – 30 December 1936), eldest son of Archduke Karl Ferdinand; Field Marshal of Austria and Supreme Commander of the K.u.K. Army; godson and heir of Archduke Albrecht, Duke of Teschen; brother of Field Marshal the Archduke Eugen; invested with the Grand Cross of the Royal Hungarian Order of St. Stephen, 1 May 1894

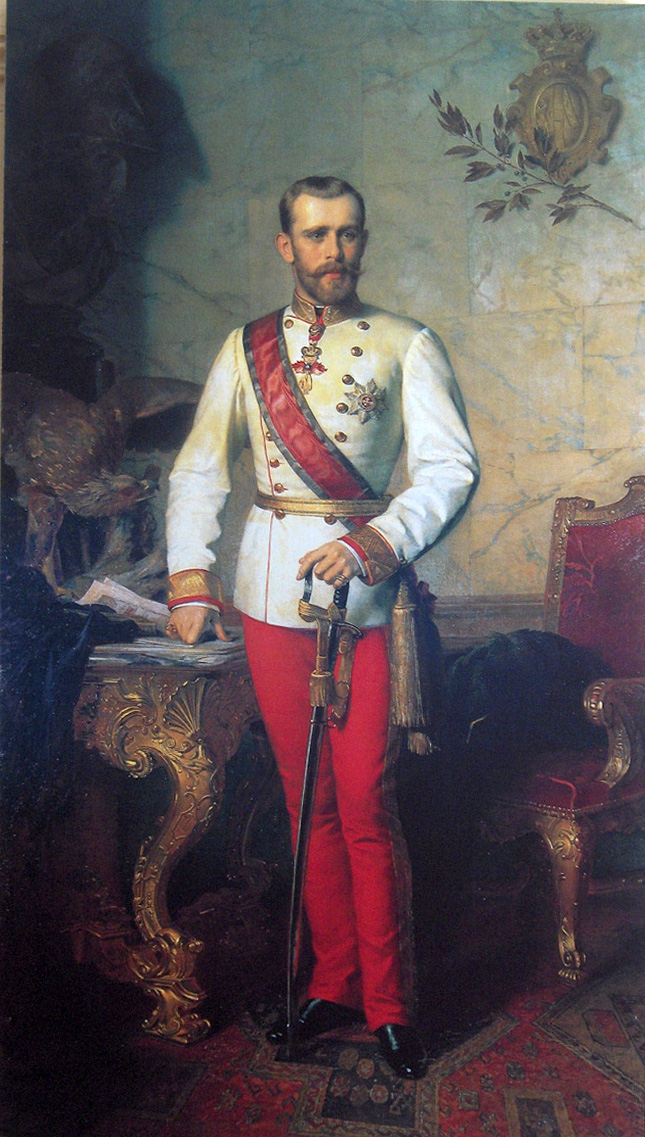
Crown Prince Rudolf, wearing the Grand Cross sash and star on his Austrian general officer's uniform

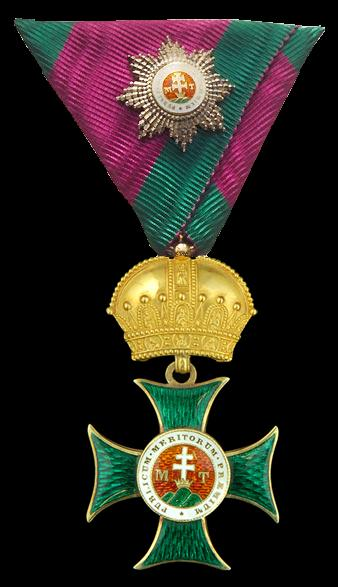
Grand Cross "kleine decoration" as worn on a knights medal. This was authorized for wear on the service dress uniform in lieu of the sash or breast star

- Kronprinz Rudolf (21 August 1858 – 30 January 1889), Archduke of Austria and Crown Prince of Hungary
- Archduke Eugen of Austria (May 21, 1863 – December 30, 1954), third and youngest son of Archduke Karl Ferdinand; Field Marshal of Austria-Hungary; invested with the Grand Cross of the Royal Hungarian Order of St Stephen, 30 March 1911; last Habsburg Grand Master of the Teutonic Order, 1894 – 1923
- Archduke Leopold Salvator of Austria (15 October 1863 – 4 September 1931), nephew of Ferdinand IV, Grand Duke of Tuscany; Colonel-General and Inspector General of Artillery in the Austro-Hungarian (K.u.K.) Army
- Archduke Franz Ferdinand of Austria-Este (December 18, 1863 – June 28, 1914), oldest son of Archduke Carl Ludwig; successor of Francis V, Duke of Modena; heir apparent of Emperor Franz Josef of Austria-Hungary; uncle of Emperor Karl I of Austria-Hungary
- Archduke Otto Franz of Austria (April 21, 1865 – November 1, 1906), second son of Archduke Carl Ludwig; brother of Archduke Franz Ferdinand; father of Emperor Karl I of Austria-Hungary
- Count István Tisza de Borosjenő et Szeged (22 April 1861 – 31 October 1918), Prime Minister of Hungary, 1903 – 1905, and 1913 – 1917
- Generaloberst Friedrich Graf von Beck-Rzikowsky (March 21, 1830 – February 9, 1920), president of the Military Chancery, General Adjutant to the Emperor, and Chief of the General Staff
- General der Kavalrie Alexander Graf von Üxküll-Gyllenband (October 2, 1836 – July 13, 1915), Privy Councilor and life member of the House of Lords; invested with the Grand Cross of the Royal Hungarian Order of Saint Stephen, August 12, 1907
- Prince Ladislaus Batthyány-Strattmann (October 28, 1870 – January 22, 1931), noble by birth, medical doctor by education; dedicated to providing medicine for the peasant class, and remembered as the “Doctor of the Poor”, Member of the Upper House from 1915; invested with the Order of the Golden Fleece, Royal Hungarian Order of Saint Stephen, and the Papal Order of the Golden Spur, 1915; beatified (“Blessed László”) by Pope John Paul II, 2003
- Generaloberst Karl Freiherr von Pflanzer-Baltin (1855–1925), commander of the 7th Army (K.u.K.), Chief of Staff to the 11th Corps, and Inspector General of Cavalry and later of Infantry; invested with the Grand Cross of the Royal Hungarian Order of Saint Stephen, August 25, 1918
- Generaloberst Eduard Graf von Paar (May 12, 1837 – February 1, 1919), General Adjutant to the Emperor
- Generaloberst Arthur frhr von Bolfas (April 16, 1838 – December 9, 1922), Chief of Staff to the 14th Corps, Chief of the Military Chancery, and General Adjutant to the Emperor
- Archduke Joseph August of Austria (9 August 1872 – 6 July 1962), son of Archduke Joseph Karl; Field Marshal of Austria-Hungary; claimed to have been awarded (by Emperor Karl I) a war decoration for his Grand Cross, October 1918, despite the fact that the Order was exclusively civilian
- Géza Baron Fejérváry de Komlós-Keresztes (1833–1914), Hungarian general officer and Prime Minister of Hungary, 1903 – 1907; invested as Knight, 1875, Knight Commander, 1882, and Grand Cross, 1901.
- Vice Admiral Miklós Horthy von Nagybánya (18 June 1868 – 9 February 1957), Vice Admiral of the Austro-Hungarian (K.u.K.) Navy, Commander-in-Chief of the Imperial Fleet, and Regent of Hungary.

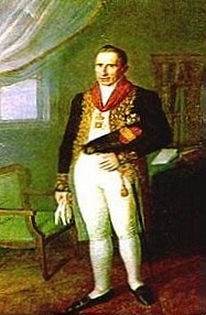
Giustino Fortunato, Prime Minister of the Kingdom of the Two Sicilies

- King Ernst August of Hannover (5 June 1771 – 18 November 1851), King of Hanover & Duke of Cumberland, fifth son of King George III of Great Britain, invested during a diplomatic visit from Prince Metternich
- Giustino Fortunato (20 August 1777 – 22 August 1862), Prime Minister of the Kingdom of the Two Sicilies, 1849 – 1852, invested in 1850
- Georg V of Hannover (27 May 1819 – 12 June 1878), invested while crown prince, during a diplomatic visit from Prince Metternich
- Sir George Hamilton-Gordon, 4th Earl of Aberdeen (28 January 1784 – 14 December 1860), Prime Minister of the United Kingdom, 1852 – 1855
- Wilhelm I (March 22, 1797 – March 9, 1888), King of Prussia and German Emperor
- Friedrich III (October 18, 1831 – June 15, 1888), King of Prussia and German Emperor, invested while crown prince
- Edward VII of the United Kingdom (9 November 1841 – 6 May 1910), King of the United Kingdom, 1901 – 1910; invested with the Grand Cross of the Royal Hungarian Order of St. Stephen, June 13, 1867
- Chulalongkorn, King of Siam (1868–1910), invested with the Grand Cross of the Royal Hungarian Order of St. Stephen, 1869
- Wilhelm II (27 January 1859 – 5 June 1941), King of Prussia and German Emperor, 1888 – 1918; invested with the Grand Cross of the Royal Hungarian Order of St. Stephen, 1872
- Alfred, Duke of Saxe-Coburg and Gotha (1844–1900), Duke of Edinburgh and Saxe-Coburg and Gotha; Admiral of the Fleet of the British Royal Navy; invested with the Grand Cross of the Royal Hungarian Order of St. Stephen, 1873
- Prince Arthur, Duke of Connaught and Strathearn (1850–1942), Duke of Connaught and Strathearn; Field Marshal of the British Army; invested with the Grand Cross of the Royal Hungarian Order of St. Stephen, 1873
- Nicholas II of Russia (1868–1918), Emperor of Russia, November 1, 1894 – March 15, 1917; invested with the Grand Cross of the Royal Hungarian Order of St. Stephen, May 6, 1884

German Emperor Wilhelm II, wearing the Grand Cross sash and star of the Order, and the Hungarian uniform of an (honorary) Field Marshal of Austria-Hungary. 1902

- Feldzeugmeister Duke Wilhelm of Württemberg (July 20, 1828 – November 6, 1896), invested October 18, 1891. Governor of Bosnia-Hercegovina
- Prince Leopold of Bavaria (February 9, 1846 – September 28, 1930), son of Prince Regent Luitpold of Bavaria (1821–1912) and Archduchess Augusta of Austria (1825–1864); Field Marshal (Generalfeldmarschall) of Bavaria; commander of German and Austro-Hungarian troops on the Eastern Front during World War I
- Porfirio Diaz (15 September 1830 – 2 July 1915), seven-time president of Mexico, invested with the Grand Cross of the Royal Hungarian Order of St. Stephen, September 30, 1901
- Ferdinand I of Bulgaria (February 26, 1861 – September 10, 1948), Tsar of Bulgaria, 7 July 1887 – 3 October 1918
- Alfonso XIII of Spain (May 17, 1886 – February 28, 1941), King of Spain, May 17, 1886 – April 14, 1931
- George V of the United Kingdom (June 3, 1865 – January 20, 1936), King of the United Kingdom, May 6, 1910 – January 20, 1936; invested with the Grand Cross of the Royal Hungarian Order of St. Stephen, 1902
- Großadmiral Alfred von Tirpitz (March 19, 1849 – March 6, 1930), grand admiral and Secretary of State of the Imperial Naval Office, Imperial German Navy, during World War One; invested with the Grand Cross of the Royal Hungarian Order of Saint Stephen, August 30, 1911
- Gennaro Granito Pignatelli di Belmonte (April 10, 1851 – February 16, 1948), Italian Cardinal of the Holy Roman Church, Papal Nuncio in Austria-Hungary (1904–1911), Dean of the Sacred College of Cardinals, later Grand Prior of Rome of the Sovereign Military Order of Malta; invested with the Grand Cross of the Royal Hungarian Order of Saint Stephen, August 30, 1911
- William John Arthur Charles James Cavendish-Bentinck, 6th Duke of Portland (December 28, 1857 – 26 April 1943)
- Generalfeldmarschall August von Mackensen (December 6, 1849 – November 8, 1945), Prussian Field Marshal
- Mindaugas II of Lithuania (né Wilhelm Karl Florestan Gero Crescentius von Württemberg, Prince of Urach, Count of Württemberg; May 30, 1864 – March 24, 1928), 3rd Duke of Urach; elected but uncrowned king of Lithuania, July 11 – November 2, 1918; invested 1917
- Zog I of Albania (ne Ahmet Muhtar Bej Zogolli, later Zogu)(8 October 1895 – 9 April 1961), Prime Minister 1922–24, President of Albania, January 21, 1926 – September 1, 1928, King of the Albanians, 9 September 1928 – 7 April 1939
- Pedro II of Brazil (2 December 1825 – 5 December 1891), Emperor of the Empire of Brazil (7 April 1831 – 15 November 1889)
- Karl Nesselrode (14 December 1780, 23 March 1862), Russian German Statesman and Diplomat of the Holy Alliance. Russian Empire Foreign Minister.

=== Knights Commander ===
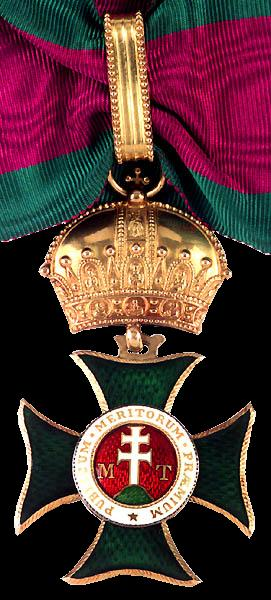
Commander's Cross, Royal Hungarian Order of Saint Stephen

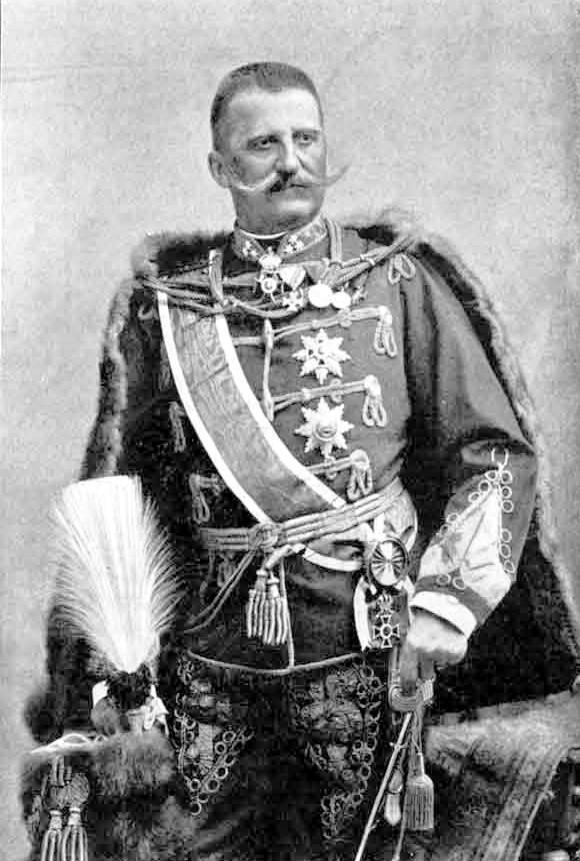
Gen. Géza Fejérváry, eventual Prime Minister of Hungary (and Grand Cross knight), wearing the Knight Commander's cross about his neck, ca 1894

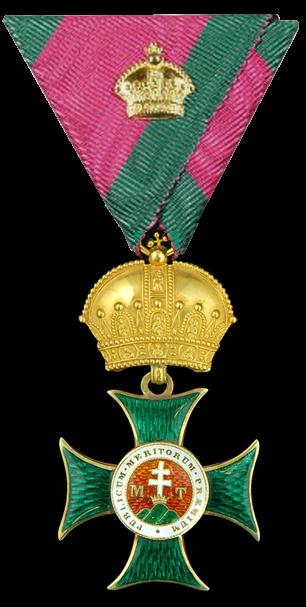
Knight Commander of the Royal Hungarian Order of Saint Stephen. The lesser decoration worn on a Knight's Cross was authorized during the Great War for those who preferred it to wearing it suspended at the neck.

- Johann Karl Chotek, Count of Chotkov und Wognin (1704–1787), Statesman and Chancellor in Bohemia; Feldzeugmeister; invested as Knight Commander upon the founding of the Order, 1764; later invested with the Grand Cross (1765)
- Leopold Stephen Graf Pálffy (b. 1716), invested as Knight Commander upon the founding of the Order, 1764; later invested with the Grand Cross (1765)
- Heinrich Kajetan Graf Blumegen (1715–1788), Landeshauptleute of Bohemia; invested as Knight Commander upon the founding of the Order, 1764; later invested with the Grand Cross (1765)
- Johann Vencel Graf Paar, invested as Knight Commander upon the founding of the Order, 1764; later invested with the Grand Cross (1765)
- Fetete Georgy Graf Galanthai (1741–1803), invested as Knight Commander upon the founding of the Order, 1764
- Ludwig Friedrich Riechsgraf von Zinzendorf und Pottendorf (1721–1780), invested as Knight Commander upon the founding of the Order, 1764
- Johann Amadeus Franz de Paula Baron von Thugut (May 24, 1733 – May 28, 1818), Austrian diplomat, 1769 – 1793; Foreign Minister of Austria, 1793 – 1800
- Count Charles Emerick Alexander von Rewischny (Rewitzky) (1737–1793), Hungarian diplomat,
- Miklós (Nicholas) grof Vay (1802–1894), member of the Hungarian Privy Council and the Hungarian Parliament; invested as Knight Commander, 1846.
- Ferenc (Francis) grof Haller, Ban of Croatia, invested as Knight Commander, 1847
- Feldzeugmeister Franz graf Gyulay (1798–1868), Austrian Minister of War; invested as Knight Commander, 1848.
- Cardinal János Scitovszky (1785–1866), Bishop of Rozsnyó and Pécs; Cardinal 1853; invested as Knight Commander, 1849.
- Cardinal György Haulik (1788–1869), Archbishop of Zagreb and Ban of Croatia; invested as Knight Commander, 1849
- Ferenc (Francis) grof Zichy (1811–1900), Secretary of State for Commerce, Széchenyi ministry of 1848, and later Austro-Hungarian Ambassador to Constantinople; invested as Knight Commander, 1849.
- Batthyány Imre (1781–1874), Jurist and Lord Lieutenant of Latvia; invested as Knight Commander, 1861.
- Stephen Melczer (1810–1896), member of the Hungarian Privy Council and House of the Lords; invested as Knight Commander, 1867.
- Baron Levin Rauch de Nyék (1819–1890), viceroy of Croatia-Slavonia, and of Kingdom of Croatia-Slavonia for four years (1867–1871); invested as knight Commander, 1869.
- Joseph Szlávy (1818–1900), Hungarian Prime Minister and later president of the Hungarian House of the Lords; invested as knight Commander, 1869.
- Baron Béla Orczy, Minister of Defense and Minister of the Interior; invested as Knight Commander, 1873.
- Feldzeugmeister Franz von Uchatius (1811–1881), ordnance expert and master artillerist, and member of the Viennese Academy of Sciences; invested as Knight Commander, 1875.
- Károly Csemegi (1826–1899), Hungarian judge and jurist; instrumental in the creation of the first criminal code in Hungary (1878); first Presiding Judge in the Hungarian Supreme Court; invested as Knight Commander, 1878.
- Sándor Matlekovits (1842–1925), Hungarian economist and author of several treatises on trade policy within the Austro-Hungarian Empire; invested as Knight Commander, 1885.
- Beniczky Ferenc, Hungarian aristocrat and Intendant of the Budapest Academy of Music and the Budapest Opera, from 1888; invested as Knight Commander, 1890.
- Daruváry Alajos (1826–1912), politician, member of both houses of the Hungarian Parliament, vice president 1898 – 1900; invested as Knight Commander, 1892.
- Generaloberst Artur frhr von Bolfras (1838–1922), chairman of the Military Chancery and general adjutant to Franz Josef I, 1889 – 1917; invested as Knight Commander, 1892.
- Dr. Heinrich Wittek (1844–1930), Austrian politician: Director General of the Ministry of Commerce, 1886 – 1897, Minister of Railways, 1897 – 1905; invested as Knight Commander, 1893.
- Semsey Andor (1833–1923), Hungarian naturalist and geologist; eventual member of the Hungarian Parliament; invested as Knight Commander, 1896.
- Dr. Miksa Falk, tutored Emperor Franz Josef I in the Hungarian language; invested as Knight Commander, 1898.
- Feldzeugmeister Oskar Potiorek (1853–1931), III Corps commander, 1897; eventual IG of the K.u.K. (1911–1913), Military Governor of Bosnia-Herzegovina (1912–1914), and 6th Army Commander (1914); invested as Knight Commander, 1906.
- Baron Guenther Heinrich von Berg (1765–1843) German Statesman, awarded June 9, 1820.

=== Knights ===
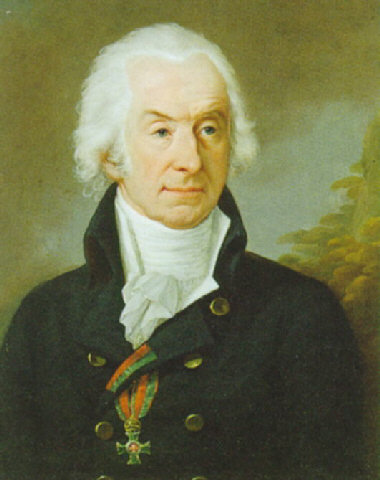
Franz, Baron von Zeiller, wearing the cross of a knight of the Royal Hungarian Order of Saint Stephen. Portrait by Anton Siegl

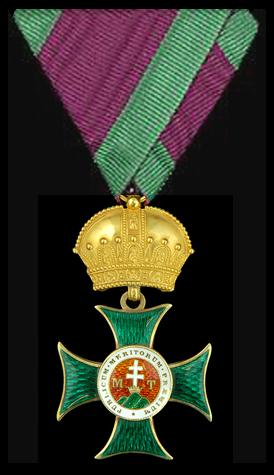
Knight's Cross of the Royal Hungarian Order of Saint Stephen

- Johann Christoph frhr von Bartenstein (1689–1767), Statesman and Privy Councilor to Karl VI, responsible for obtaining succession of Maria Theresa to the throne, personal tutor / educator of Josef II; Director of the House Archives; invested as a Knight of the Order upon its founding, 1764
- Johann Anton Graf Pergen (1725–1814), invested as a Knight of the Order upon its founding, 1764
- Friedrich frhr von Binder, invested as a Knight of the Order upon its founding, 1764; later invested as Knight Commander (1765)
- Koller Ferenc Nagymányai, invested as a Knight of the Order upon its founding, 1764; later invested as Knight Commander (1765)
- Franz Anton Felix Edler von Zeiller (January 14, 1751 – August 23, 1828), Imperial and Royal Courtier; Jurist, legal scholar, theorist and philosopher; Member of the academy; Invested as a Knight of the Order, 1810
- Feldzeugmeister Joseph frhr Philippovic von Philippsberg (April 30, 1818 – August 6, 1889), Commander of the 2nd (K.u.K.) Army and veteran of campaigns in Croatia, Prussia, Bosnia and Herzegovina; Invested as a Knight of the Order ("kleinkreuz"), November 24, 1864
- General der Kavallerie Arthur frhr von Gieslingen (June 19, 1857 – December 3, 1935), member of the General Staff, commander of the Theresian Military Academy, division commander in World War One, and member of the Privy Council; Invested as a Knight of the Order, March 12, 1909
- Feldmarschalleutnant Rudolph Schamshula, member of the General Staff, Chief of the Telegraph Bureau, and eventual commander of the 52nd Infantry Division during the Great War; invested 1918
- Oberst Ludwig von Sündermann, Chief of Staff, VIII. Corps, during the Great War; invested 1918
- Generalmajor Johann Straub von Burgauhof (November 14, 1866 – October 18, 1929), member of the General Staff; Chief and commandant of Military Railroads; invested 1918
- Generalmajor Josef Ritter von Paić (September 26, 1867 – April 21, 1933), invested 1918
- Feldmarschalleutnant Árpád Kiss von Nagy-Sittke (September 10, 1859 – March 6, 1921), invested 1918
- Feldmarschalleutnant Kolomann Török von Harasztos (October 16, 1858 – June 3, 1926), invested 1918
- Generalmajor Heinrich Graf von Hoyos (June 4, 1865 – April 28, 1955), invested 1918
- Feldmarschalleutnant Karl Andreas Aloys frhr von Bienerth (April 20, 1825 – March 5, 1882), invested 1918
- Oberst Theodor Zeynek (1873–1948), member of the General Staff; invested 1918
- Major Rudolf Kundmann, member of the General Staff; Adjutant to Chief of Staff Hötzendorf; kept a diary of life inside the General Staff; invested 1918
- Generalmajor Anton Hellebronth von Tiszabeö (b. December 20, 1858), invested 1918

== The Royal Hungarian Order of Saint Stephen – Kingdom of Hungary (1920–1946) ==
After the dissolution of Austria-Hungary, Hungary and Austria could not make a legal agreement on the rights of the Order. The base of the argument was whether Maria Theresa founded the Order de jure as the sovereign of Hungary, or the sovereign of Austria, or as Holy Roman Empress. In 1938, when Austria as a de jure successor state of Austria-Hungary ceased to exist by becoming part of Germany, Horthy issued an addendum to be attached on 4 November 1938 to the statutes of the Order which declared that as long as the Regent was the head of the Kingdom of Hungary, he also held the powers and duties of the Grand Master.

=== Knights, Grand Cross ===
- Pál Count Teleki de Szék (1879–1941), Prime Minister of Hungary and Chief Scout of the Hungarian Scout Association, invested 1940
- Hermann Göring, Reichsmarschall of Germany
- Joachim von Ribbentrop, Reich Minister of Foreign Affairs, Germany
- Galeazzo Ciano, Minister of Foreign Affairs, Italy
- Jusztinián György Cardinal Serédi (1884–1945), Cardinal of Hungary, invested 1944

=== Knights Commander ===
- István Uray, Chief of the Regent's cabinet, invested 1943

== See also ==
- Military Order of Maria Theresa
- Order of Franz Joseph
- Order of Leopold
- Order of St. George (Habsburg-Lorraine)
- Order of the Iron Crown
- Orders, decorations, and medals of Austria-Hungary
- Order of chivalry
- Hungarian Order of Saint Stephen
