= General Haller =

General Haller may refer to:

- Franz Haller (1796–1875), Hungarian Army lieutenant general
- Józef Haller (1873–1960), Polish Army lieutenant general
- Stanisław Haller (1872–1940), Polish Army general
