= Adrien Goffinet =

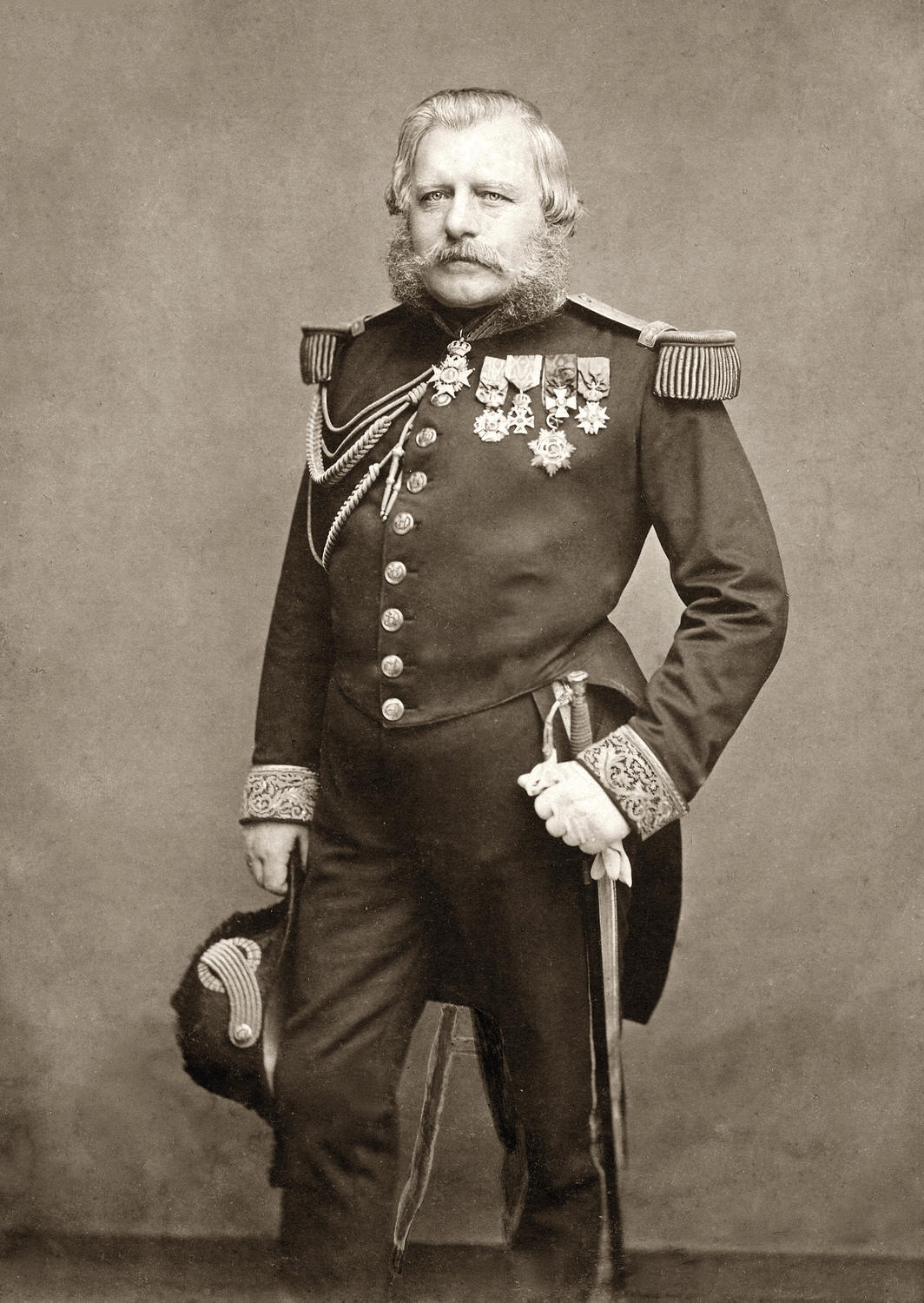

Baron Goffinet
- In office 1867–1886

Personal details
- Born: April 10, 1812
- Died: December 21, 1886 (aged 74)
- Children: Auguste Goffinet

Adrien Goffinet (Neufchâteau, 10 April 1812 – Brussels, 21 December 1886)

Baron Adrien Goffinet senior was one of the most trusted dignitaries at the Belgian court. His father Adrien Goffinet was made the knighthood of Leopold granted by royal decree in 1833, following a brilliant military career. After his military career he was sent in 1839 to the Hague, where he was asked by the Belgian commission to form the new Belgian borders. One of his most important missions was to bring the empress dowager Charlotte from Miramare to her brother Leopold II in Belgium. Leopold asked to escort his wife Queen Marie Henriette to the Viennese Court. The queen was the niece of emperor Franz-Josef I of Austria. Charlotte was kept in Miramare under the close supervision of Count de Bombelles.

He was the father of Auguste Goffinet.

== Honours ==
- Belgium : Created Baron Goffinet by Royal Decree of 15.3.1867.
- Belgium : Grand cordon of the Order of Leopold
- Belgium : Knight Grand cross in the Order of the Crown
- Knight Grand Cross in the Royal Order of Saint Michael
- Knight Grand Cross in the Order of the Lion and the Sun
- Knight Grand Cross in the Most Exalted Order of the White Elephant
- Knight Grand Cross in the House Order of Saxe-Ernestine
- Officer in the Order of the Netherlands Lion
- Officier in the Legion of Honour
- Knight in the Order of Franz Joseph
