= Josip Mihalović =

Croatian-Hungarian cardinal and archbishop

His Eminence Josip Mihalović
- Cardinal; Archbishop of Zagreb
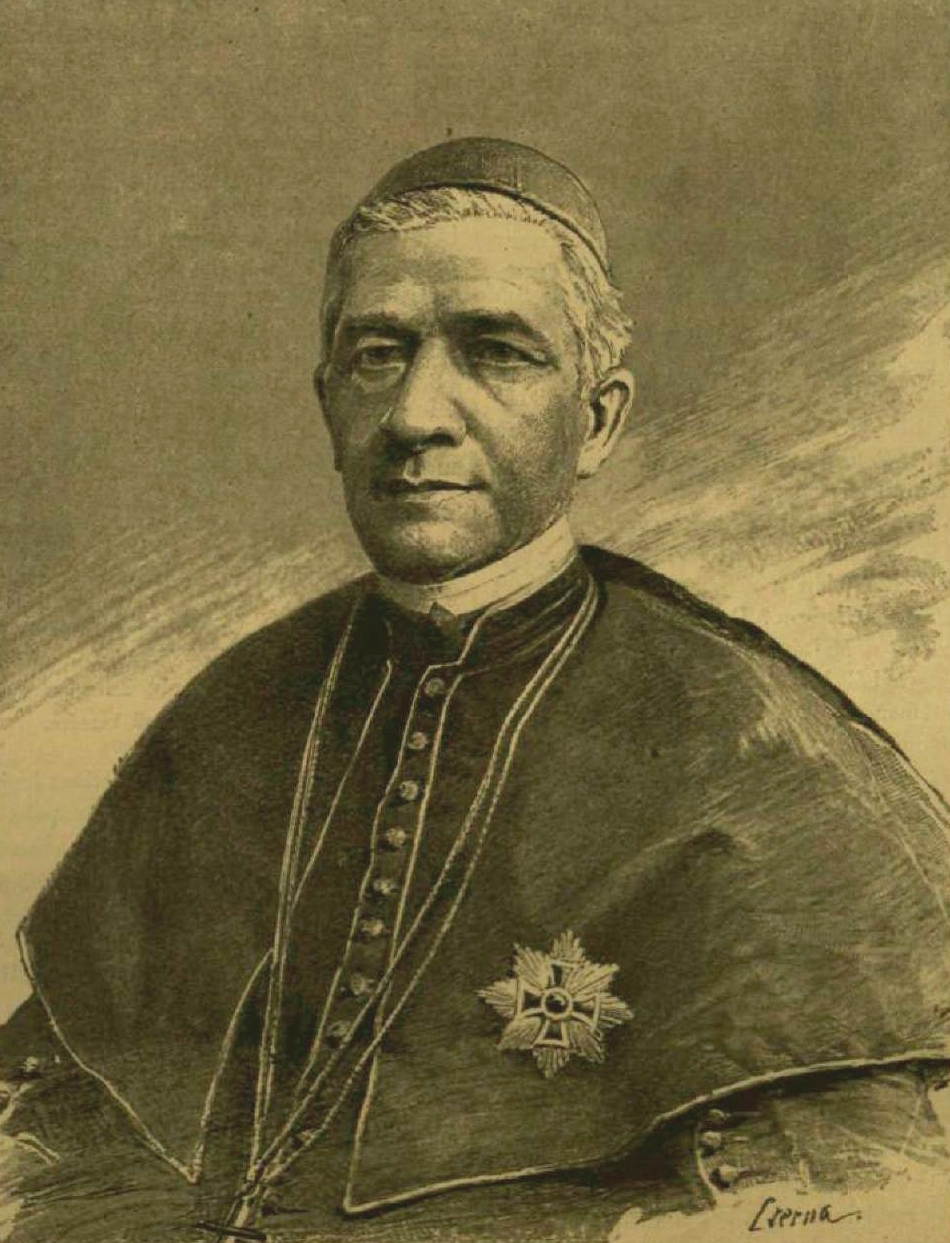
- Church: Catholic Church
- Archdiocese: Archdiocese of Zagreb
- Province: Zagreb
- See: Zagreb
- Appointed: 4 May 1870
- Installed: 7 August 1870
- Term ended: 19 February 1891
- Predecessor: Juraj Haulik
- Successor: Juraj Posilović
- Other post: Bishop of Duvno (1868–1870)

Orders
- Ordination: 12 August 1836 by Josip Lonović
- Consecration: 17 July 1870 by Mariano Falcinelli Antoniacci
- Created cardinal: 22 June 1877 by Pope Pius IX
- Rank: Cardinal-Priest

Personal details
- Born: 16 January 1814 Torda, Hungary, Austrian Empire
- Died: 19 February 1891 (aged 77) Zagreb, Croatia-Slavonia, Transleithania, Austria-Hungary
- Buried: Zagreb Cathedral
- Denomination: Catholic
- Coat of arms

Josip Mihalović (Hungarian: Mihalovics József; 16 January 1814 – 19 February 1891) was a Croatian-Hungarian Cardinal of the Catholic Church and Archbishop of Zagreb from 1870 to 1891.

== Biography ==
=== Origins ===
House of Mihalović (also Mihalovich, Mihalovics, Mihalovits, Mihajlović) was a noble family from Orahovica in Slavonia that originated in Macedonia. In 1716, Emperor Charles VI granted them nobility status because they served as Habsburg officers and had fought against Ottomans during the Hundred Years' Croatian–Ottoman War. By 1763 they were Eastern Orthodox Christians and were known under the name Mihajlović. Their economic and social rise began after their conversion to Catholicism. Several notable men came from House of Mihailović, including composer Ödön (1842–1929), Károly Dragutin (1830–1918), Hugo (1874–1956), Antun (1868–1949), the last ban of Croatia in Austria-Hungary.

=== Early life and education ===
Josip Mihalović was born in a small village of Torda in Hungary (now Vojvodina, Serbia) where he attended lower elementary school. He attended elementary school in Zrenjanin, high school in Szeged and additional schools in Timișoara where he also completed philosophy and theology studies and gained a doctorate in theology. From 1834, he worked in the episcopal office. Mihalović was ordained as a priest on 12 August 1836 by Bishop Josip Lonović. In 1837, he became a chaplain of the town parish in Timișoara and in 1837 a notary of the Holy See. In 1841, he was appointed as a bishop's secretary, and in 1846 the principal of the Office of Bishops. In February 1848, Mihalović became a canon, and in 1849, a bishop's deputy.

=== Revolutions of 1848 ===
During the Hungarian Revolution of 1848, Mihalović sided with the Hungarian rebels. After the revolution was suppressed, he was brought before the Military Court in Timișoara. On 17 November 1848, he was deprived of all services, honourable titles, and estates, and sentenced to four years in prison, out of which he served two in the fortress in the town of Leopold near Nitra in present-day Slovakia. In 185,2 he received a pardon and was allowed to serve the next four years as a chaplain in his homeland under constant police surveillance. In October 1855, Mihalović became a parish priest in Dudeștii Vechi. Four years later, he was appointed the local school's dean and superintendent. In May 1861, he was made a canon, and in June 1861 a pastor in a local Timișoara factory, and eventually an abbot in Sveti Martin na Muri.

== Bishop and cardinal ==
In 1868, Mihalović was nominated as the titular bishop of Duvno by Emperor Franz Joseph. On 4 May 1870, he was appointed as the archbishop of Zagreb, and on 17 July, he received episcopal ordination in Vienna. The consecrator was Archbishop Mariano Falcinelli Antoniacci, the titular bishop of Athens. Mihalović was enthroned in Zagreb on 6 August 1870. He was appointed as the archbishop at the time when the Croatian–Hungarian Settlement, a pact signed in 1868, that governed Croatia's political status in the Hungarian-ruled part of Austria-Hungary, was fiercely contested by the Croatian opposition parties, and so, Mihalović was, as a supporter of the ruling Unionist Party, harshly criticised by the Croatian opposition. Ignjat Brlić, one of the fiercest critics of his appointment, described Mihalović's appointment as a breach of the Settlement because the title of the archbishop was given to a foreigner.

On 22 June 1877, Pope Pius IX appointed him to the position of the cardinal-priest at San Pancrazio fuori le mura. He received the cardinal's hat in Rome in St Peter's Basilica on 25 June 1877. Mihalović participated in the 1878 conclave in which Vincenzo Gioacchino Raffaele Luigi Pecci was elected Pope. Emperor Franz Joseph wanted Mihalović to become Archbishop of Zagreb. Still, Mihalović at first hesitated because of the complex political situation in Croatia, so he decided to resign and seek a transfer to one of the Hungarian dioceses. However, the Emperor and church leaders made him change his mind, and he eventually stayed.

Before the 1881 Croatian parliamentary election, Mihalović opposed the election of the clergy to the Parliament of Croatia, this was primarily directed against the clergy involved with the opposition. Also, Mihalović, at the request of a Hungarian episcopate to secede Međimurje to them, allowed preaching in the Hungarian language in Čakovec. Nevertheless, Mihalović stood for the Croatian interests as well, when he supported the annexation of the Military Frontier (1881) and Bosnia and Herzegovina (1878) by Croatia.

Bishops Mihalović, Haulik and Strossmayer have been very active in promoting church, social, cultural and political life. Mihalović mainly was oriented to church life, especially to the education of young seminarians. In 1878, he established a male seminary and gymnasium in Zagreb. In addition, he gave financial support for four canons for the students in the seminary. Mihalović appointed Juraj Posilović to the position of editor of the Zagreb Catholic paper (ZKL; 1872–1875). In 1874, Posilović became a regular lecturer at the Theological Faculty of the University of Franz Joseph I. He remained a lecturer until he was appointed Bishop of Senj-Modruš. During this period, ZKL published several professional discussions on the occasion of the First Vatican Council, including the famous constitution Eternal Shepherd (Vječni pastir, ie, Pastor Aeternus), which contains the definition of papal infallibility. Liberals accused Jesuits of being the constitution's real authors, which resulted in many priests, bishops and ZKL having to protect them. ZKL also reported that bishop Strossmayer (active member of the liberal People's Party) published parliamentary regulations in his journal, thus accepting them.

=== 1880 reconstruction of the Cathedral ===
One of Mihalović's greatest accomplishments was the Zagreb Cathedral restoration. In 1874, bishop Strossmayer, who had large estates throughout Slavonia, started collecting funds for the Cathedral reconstruction. One of the promoters of reconstitution was also Josip Stadler. Reconstruction was interrupted on 9 November 1880 by a 6.3 magnitude earthquake that struck Zagreb. Although only one person was killed in the earthquake, it destroyed or damaged many buildings, including the cathedral. Of the 32 altars, only three were kept after renovation. After the earthquake, the reconstruction of the cathedral was conducted between 1880 and 1902 in the neo-Gothic style by the architect Hermann Bollé with funds provided by Izidor Kršnjavi.

== Death ==
Mihailović died on 19 February 1891 in Zagreb at the age of 77. He was buried in the cathedral. Liberal magazine Obzor, which he often defied during his lifetime, paid him tribute by publishing an article which stated in part: "[Josip Mihalović] failed to justify fears of the [Croatian] people, ...For him, the realm of gentleness and justice were not empty words.

In 1886, the 50th anniversary of Mihalović's first Mass was celebrated throughout the Archdiocese of Zagreb. It became clear that "he managed to get full sympathy of the incredulous Croatian people with his meekness and wisdom."

== Footnotes ==
Catholic Church titles
Preceded by Juraj Haulik	Archbishop of Zagreb; 1870–1891	Succeeded by Juraj Posilović
