= Napoleon Touzet =

Napoleon Touzet was a medical doctor of Austrian (Tyrolean) origin, who emigrated to Petropolis, Brazil. An avid naturalist, he collected specimens of animals, which he donated to Museums across Europe.

Touzet received the following distinctions for his work:

- On March 4, 1859, the Knight's Cross of the Imperial Austrian Order of Franz Joseph. p.204
- Medal of the Order of the Polar Star by the King of Sweden
- Correspondent member of the Stockholm Academy of Sciences (Royal Swedish Academy of Sciences)
