= Philipp Sarlay =

Austrian principal of telegraph office

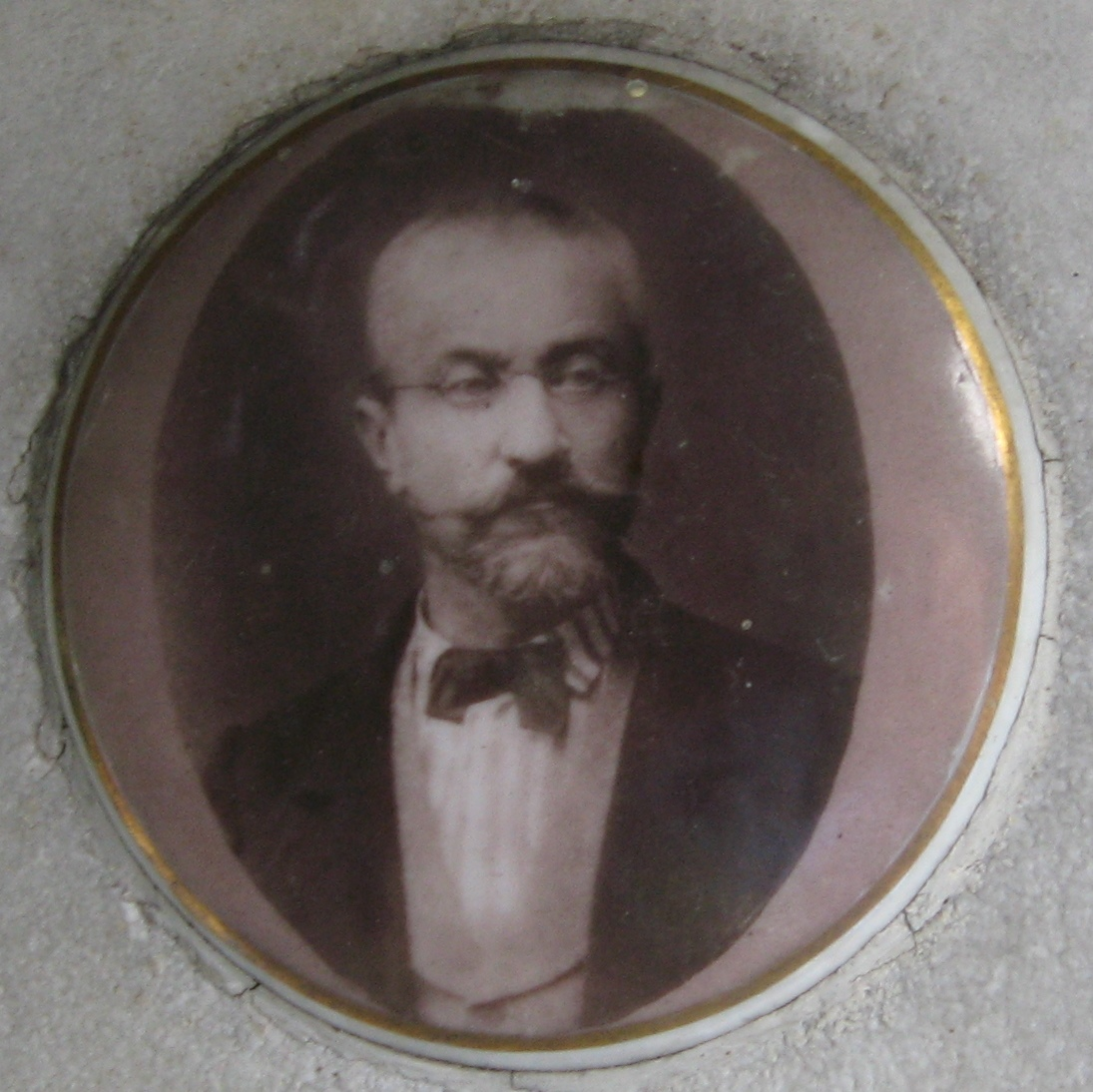
Philipp Sarlay Portrait

Philipp Sarlay, also named Filipp Sarlay (10 December 1826, in Klattau – 5 April 1908, in Innsbruck, Tyrol) was an Austrian principal of telegraph office of Austrian-Hungarian origin and a pioneer in technological and scientific accomplishments. He was a follower of naturopathy, abstainer and vegetarian. Furthermore, he was occupied by studying mathematical phenomena.

== Family ==
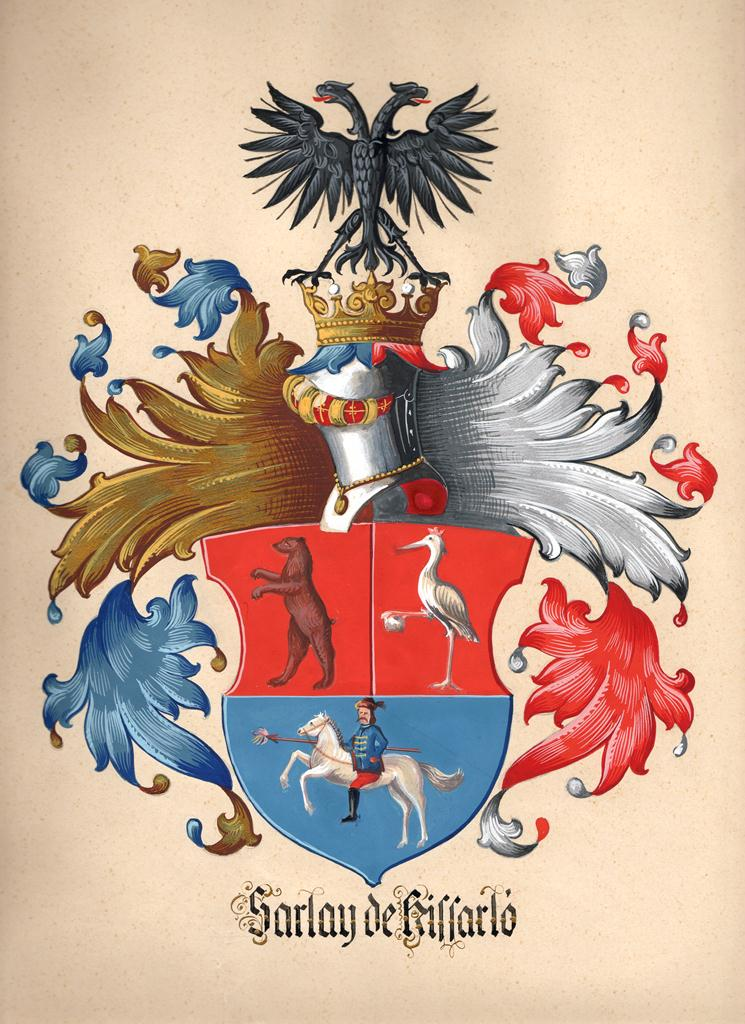
Crest / Coat of ArmsFamily Sarlay de Kissarló

His parents were Anton Sarlay (* 16. July 1774; † 19. July 1856), in Klattau and Leonarda née Edle von Santa (* 9. February 1786; † 31. March 1852 in Preßburg, Kingdom of Hungary). His father was from the Hungarian nobility. His siblings were Joseph, Marie, Emerich (lieutenant), Karl and Anton. In his first marriage Philipp Sarlay was married to Marie Aicher (* 1840 in Innsbruck; † 19. March 1875 in Innsbruck). During one year, all four children died. One year later Marie died because of scarlatina. Sarlay married Aloisia Josefa Aicher (* 9. July 1847 in Innsbruck; † 4. January 1882 in Innsbruck, Tirol). With Aloisia he had three sons, Anton, Ferdinand, Emerich und Leo (* 27. June 1879 in Innsbruck; † 18. December 1967 in Innsbruck). Emerich and Ferdinand were passionate alpinists and the first ones to reach the peaks of Gamezkogel (30. August 1900), Steinkogel (19. August 1901) and Zuragkogel (21. August 1901) in the Oetz Valley Alps.

== Expansion of the Austrian-Hungarian telecommunications network ==
Philipp Sarlay studied at the high school in Klattau and at the Technical School of Prague. As an enthusiastic student, he lived the eventful year of 1848. In 1849 the first experiments on telegraphy started in Austria and in 1849 the Emperor decided to erect a telegraph network covering the whole monarchy. In 1850 Sarlay joined the civil service as a telegrapher and served in Oderberg, Gloggnitz and Vienna. In 1856, he was sent to Innsbruck as a telegraph commissar by the Emperor's request. In 1870, he took over the position as inspector in Reichenberg and in 1872 the position as principal in Czernowitz. Among the constructions led by him there are the telegraph lines Lugos to Hermannstadt (1855), Oderberg to Dembica, Dziedzice to Bielitz and Schönbrunn to Troppau (1856). Between 1880 and 1890 Philipp Sarlay managed the agency Fohnsdorfer Kohle. He lived up to the motto: "Fresh, docile, happy, free". The magazine "Tiroler Technik" ("Tyrolian Technology") by the Tiroler Heimatblätter newspaper publisher named Philipp Sarlay as the first biker of Tyrol when he used his bike on April 24, 1869. One day later he drove the road to Wattens where the vehicle was admired. In 1885, he was portrayed in the paper of the Dutch Union of Velocipedists as the oldest biker of Austria. In 1877 member of the Scientific-Medical Club in Innsbruck. Sarlay also appears under the pseudonym of Yalras, F.

== Decoration ==
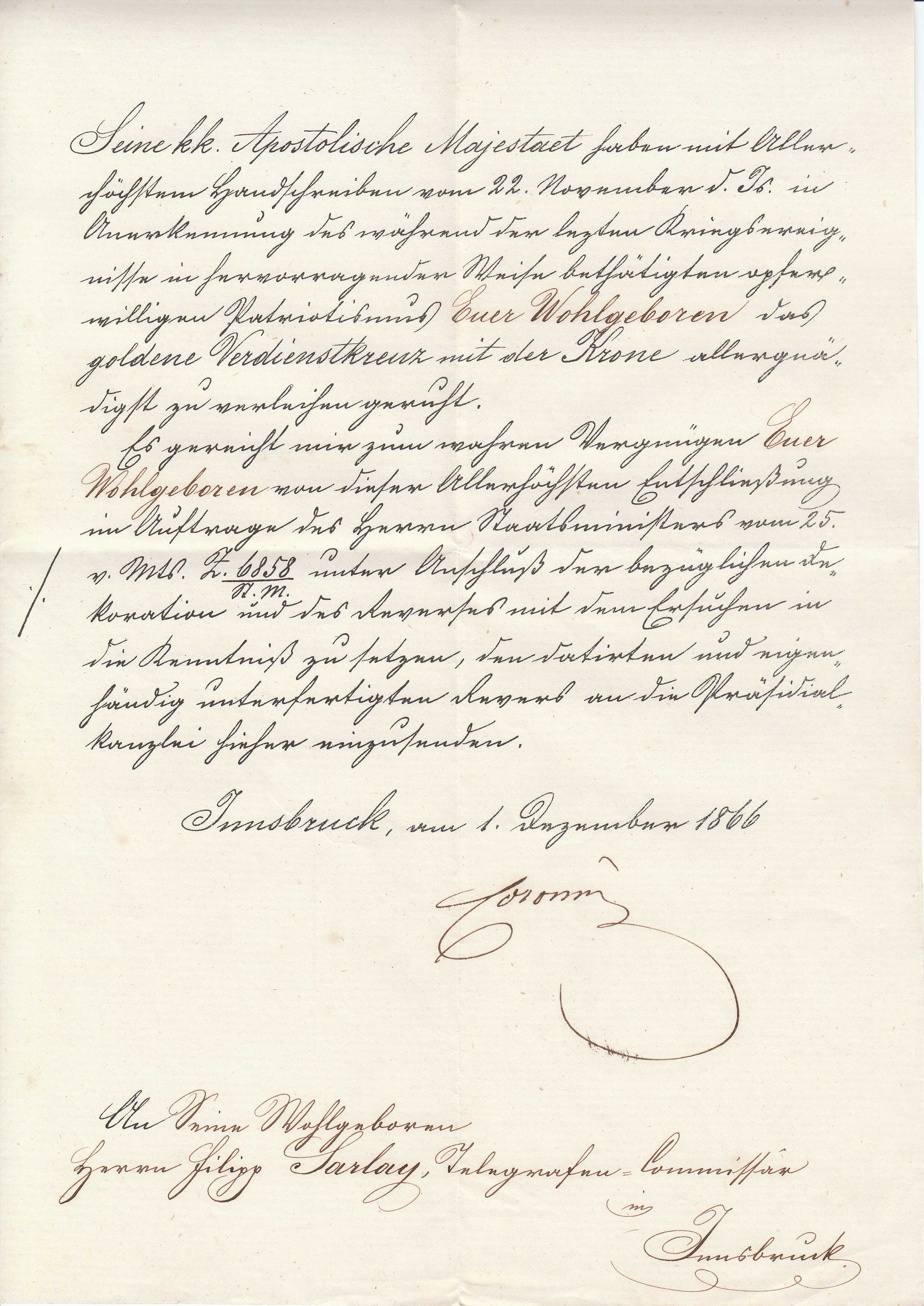
Document Letter of Golden Cross of Merit with Crown 1866

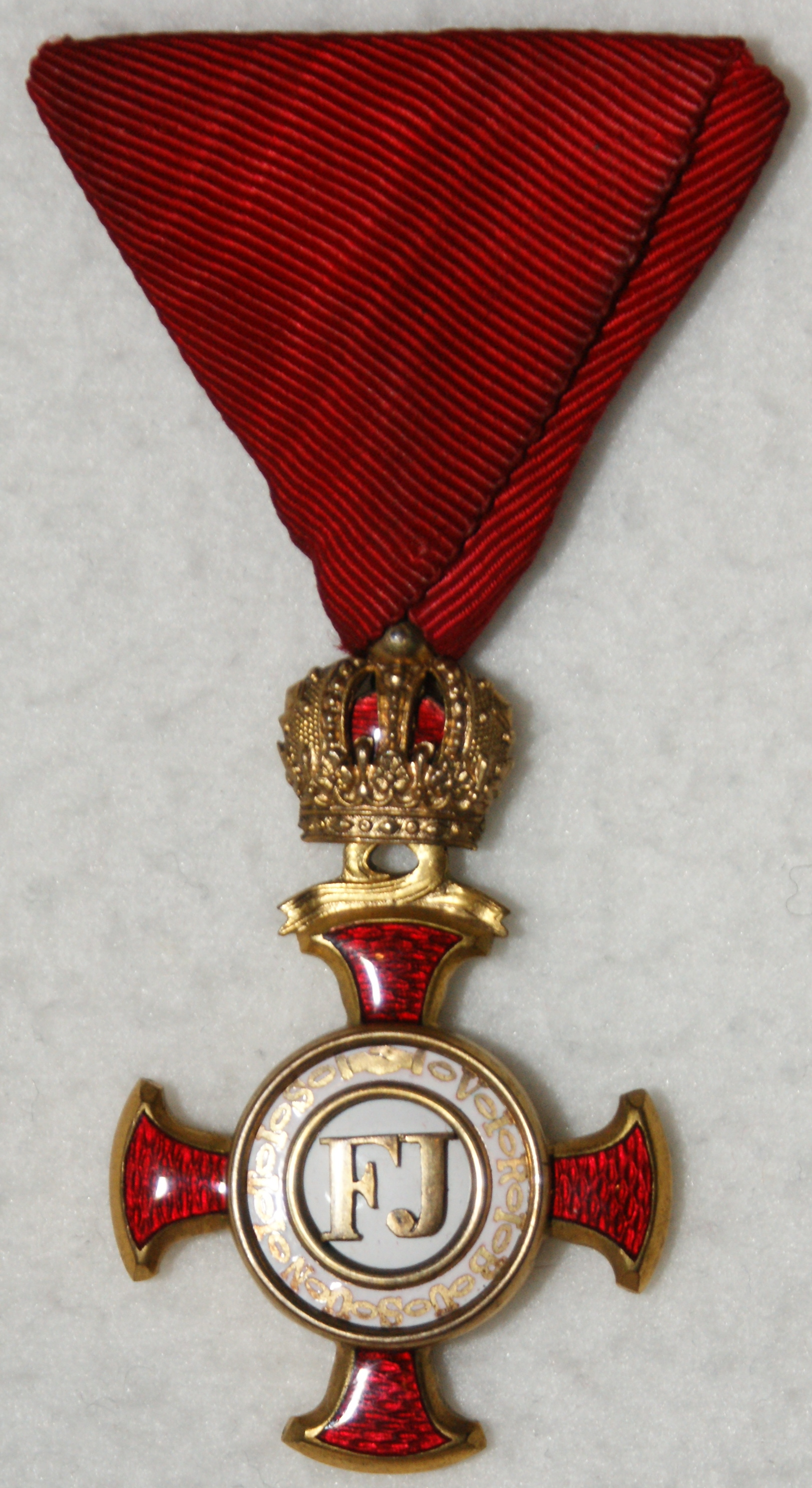
Golden Cross of Merit with Crown

Philipp Sarlay received the Order of Franz Joseph Golden Cross of Merit with Crown on 1 December 1866. The Golden Cross of Merit with Crown is the highest order of all Order of Franz Joseph

== Literature ==
- Bote für Tirol und Vorarlberg: 55.Jg., 11. November 1869, Nr.258, page 1320
- Bote für Tirol und Vorarlberg: 55.Jg., 11. September 1869, Nr.207, page 1057
- Innsbrucker Nachrichten: 16.Jg., 10. September 1869, Nr.206, page 5 f
- Maandblad Nederlandsche Velocidepistenbond (1883), Nr 13 en 14, April Mai 1885, page 5 f
- Österreichische Alpenzeitung: 22.Jg., 25. Oktober 1900, issue 568, page 267
- Tiroler Heimatblätter Tiroler Technik: 18.Jg., issue 9, 1935 page 368
- Zeitschrift des Ferdinandeums fur Tirol und Vorarlberg: III. issue 56, page 440
- Schulze, H.: Chronik sämtlicher bekannten Ritter-Orden und Ehrenzeichen welche von Souverainen und Regierungen verliehen werden nebst Abbildungen der Decorationen. - Chronique de tous les ordres et marques d'honneur de chevalerie accordés par des souverains et de régences avec les dessins des décorations. Berlin 1853, page 736
