= Auguste Goffinet =

Belgian dignitary at the Imperial Court of Mexico in exile

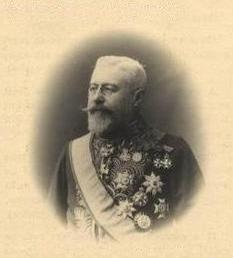
Baron Auguste Goffinet, twins

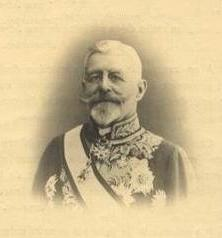
Baron Constant Goffinet, twins

Auguste Constant Jules Marie Baron Goffinet (28 August 1857, Brussels – 4 April 1927, Brussels) was a Belgian dignitary at the Imperial Court of Mexico in exile.

== Family ==
He was the son of Adrien Goffinet, who was made Aide-de-camp of King Leopold I at a very young age. By decree of the Royal Household, Auguste Goffinet entered court on 15 February 1876, in service of the duke of Brabant. During his career he was sent by Royal Command to various diplomatic missions and guarded the Private fortune of the King.

By Royal Command he guarded the Imperial Household of Charlotte of Mexico, the daughter of King Leopold I.

In 1993 the King Baudouin foundation purchased the archives of the brothers Goffinet, with important documents on royal court history.

== Functions ==
- Grand Master of the Imperial Household
- Master of the Royal Commandments
