= July victims =

1845 victims in Zagreb, Croatia

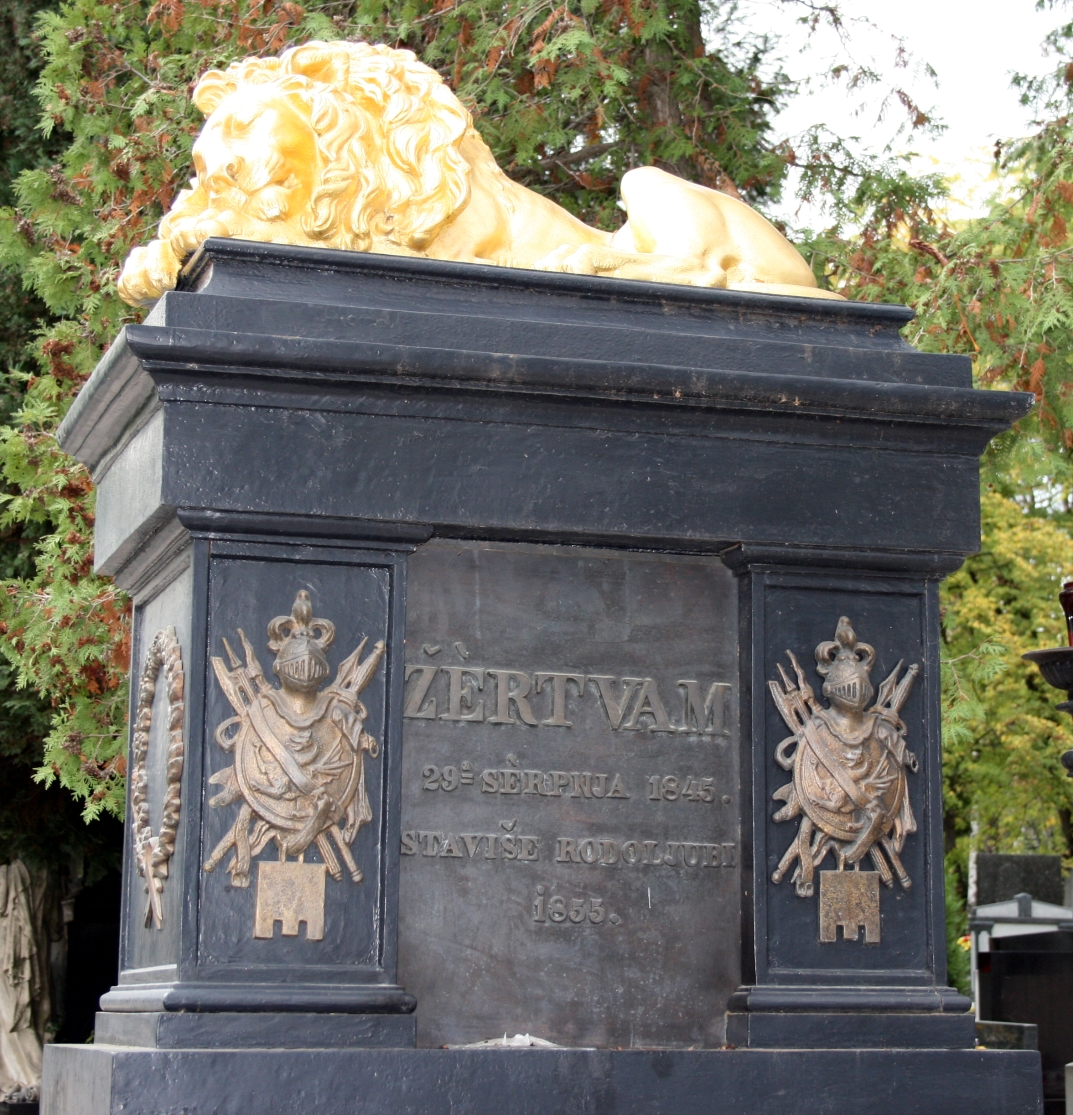
In 1855, a monument was erected for the July victims in Zagreb.

The July victims (Croatian: Srpanjske žrtve) were members of the Croatian People's Party who fell victim to a crackdown by the Austrian Imperial Army on July 29, 1845.

In 1845, there were local elections for the government of Zagreb County, the county containing the capital of Croatia, Zagreb. The Croatian-Hungarian Party candidate won by voter fraud. Upon the announcement of election results, members of the People's Party took to St. Mark's Square to protest the result and accused the winners of vote fraud. The Croatian ban, the ethnic Hungarian Franz Haller called on the Austrian Army to empty the square.

When the army moved in to empty the square, one of the protesters, Mirko Bogović, attacked an army officer with a sabre. The army officer was defended by a soldier who fired at Bogović. That led to other soldiers believing an order to fire was issued. The army emptied their bullets into the crowd. In the end, thirteen of the People's Party's protesters were killed and 27 were injured. Six of the injured later succumbed to their wounds.

Ten victims of the shooting were buried at the St. George Cemetery (today the July Victims Park), and their funeral grew into large-scale political protests. Due in large part to this incident, Ban Haller left his post and bishop Juraj Haulik took his place soon after.

In 1855, the July victims' grave was adorned with a sculpture of a sleeping lion. In 1895, their remains July victims were interred in Zagreb's new cemetery, Mirogoj.

The incident showed the tension developed between Croats who supported the Illyrian movement and the restoration of a unified Croatian Kingdom, and Hungarian-Croatians (Magyars) and the minority of Croats who supported closer relations with Hungary (represented by the Croatian-Hungarian Party). In the following years, Croatia gained some concessions, as Croatian replaced Latin as the nation's official language.
