= Juraj Haulik =

Croatian cardinal (1788–1869)

His Eminence Juraj Haulík Váralyai
- Cardinal; Archbishop of Zagreb
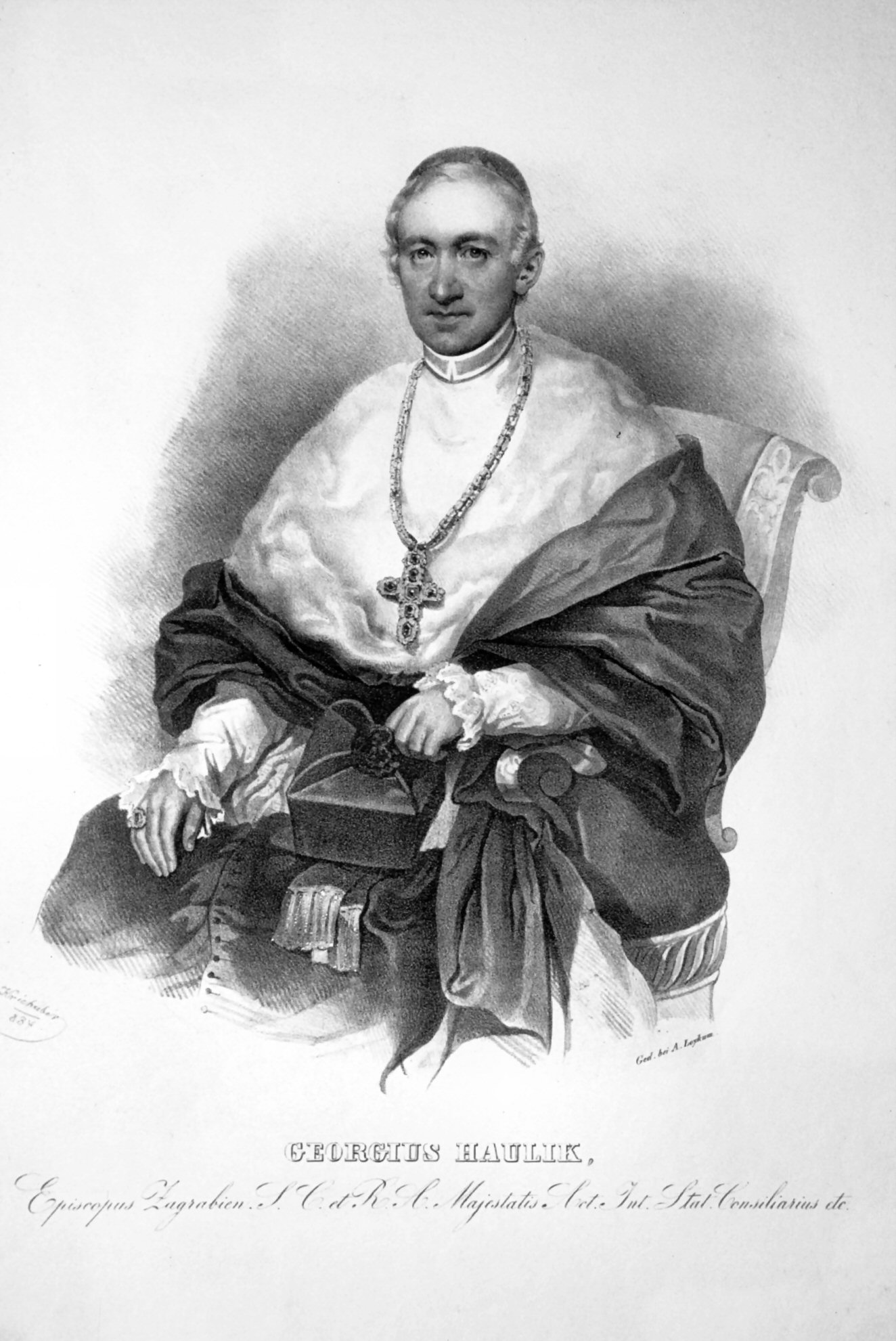
- Church: Roman Catholic
- Archdiocese: Zagreb
- Appointed: 11 December 1852
- In office: 1852–1869
- Predecessor: Aleksandar Alagović
- Successor: Josip Mihalović
- Other post: Cardinal-Priest of Santi Quirico e Giulitta

Orders
- Ordination: 18 April 1811
- Consecration: 10 December 1837 by Lodovico Altieri
- Created cardinal: 16 June 1856 by Pius IX
- Rank: Cardinal-Priest

Personal details
- Born: 20 April 1788 Trnava, Kingdom of Hungary, Habsburg monarchy
- Died: 11 May 1869 (aged 81) Zagreb, Croatia-Slavonia, Austria-Hungary
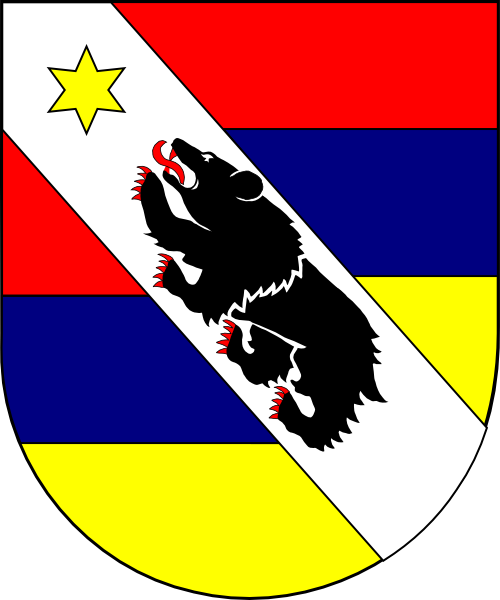
- Coat of arms

Juraj Haulik de Váralya (Slovak: Juraj Haulík Váralyai, Hungarian: Haulík Váralyai György; 20 April 1788 – 11 May 1869) was a Croatian cardinal in the Roman Catholic Church of Slovak ethnicity and the first archbishop of Zagreb. He was also acting ban of Croatia for two separate terms.

== Life ==
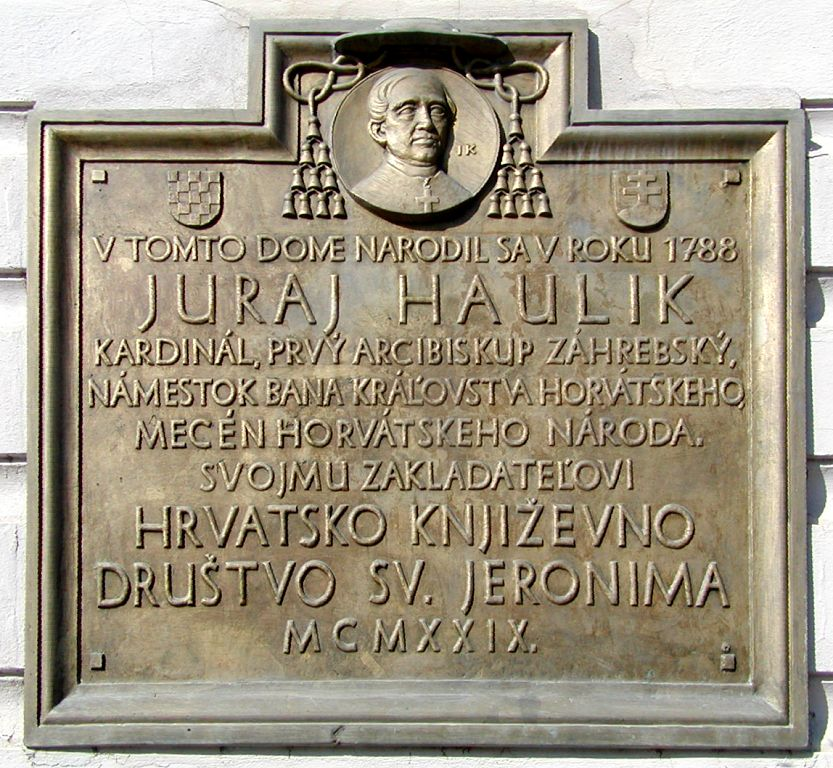
A tablet on the house where Haulik was born

He studied theology and philosophy in Trnava, Esztergom and Vienna. After the death of bishop Aleksandar Alagović in 1837, Haulik was proclaimed bishop. In 1840 he began his first term as acting ban of Croatia after the death of ban Franjo Vlašić. He is credited for introducing the Croatian language into schools and workplaces, as well as forming the Matica hrvatska in 1842. He helped the organization of Maksimir park in Zagreb.

He was succeeded as ban by the Hungarian Franz Haller. Haller was brought in to carry on Magyarization in Croatia, which included the banning of the then Croatian banner name: Illyrians. A protest by the Croatian People's Party in 1845 was put out violently by Haller, leaving thirteen protestors dead, and ending his time as ban. Haulik was again called upon to take up the post.

During this term, the Croatian language was made official in the Kingdom of Croatia-Slavonia in 1847. In 1848, in the midst of revolutions in the Austro-Hungarian Empire, military man Josip Jelačić was proclaimed ban, terminating union with Hungary and advocating for Croatian autonomy.

Some further autonomy did materialize for Croatia in the following years, as Haulik was proclaimed the first archbishop and metropolitan of Zagreb in 1852. With this, the Catholic Church in Croatia became independent from Hungary. In 1856 he was also named Cardinal. He carried on in these posts until his death in 1869.

While he was an ethnic Slovak, he said of his background: I was born a Slovak, but I will die a Croat. In 1999, Croatia and Slovakia put out a joint-issue stamp featuring Haulik.

Catholic Church titles
Preceded by Aleksandar Alagović	Archbishop of Zagreb; 1837–1869	Succeeded by Josip Mihalović
Preceded by Franjo Vlašić	Ban of Croatia; 1840–1842	Succeeded by Franz Haller
Preceded by Franz Haller	Ban of Croatia; 1845–1848	Succeeded by Josip Jelačić
