= Order of Franz Joseph =

Order of chivalry of Austria

Imperial Order of Franz Joseph
- Grand Cross star of the order

Awarded by The Head of the House of Habsburg-Lorraine
- Type: Order of merit (1849–1918); Dynastic order (1918—)
- Established: 2 December 1849
- Royal house: House of Habsburg-Lorraine
- Motto: VIRIBUS UNITIS ("With United Forces")
- Awarded for: Civil Merit
- Status: Dormant Order since 1918
- Sovereign: Crown Prince Karl of Austria
- Grades: Grand Cross; Commander with Star; Commander; Officer; Knight
- Post-nominals: FJO

Statistics
- First induction: 1849
- Last induction: 1918

Precedence
- Next (higher): Order of the Iron Crown; Order of Elizabeth
- Next (lower): Order of Saint George; Order of Elizabeth and Theresa
- | Ribbons of the order

The Imperial Austrian Order of Franz Joseph (German: Kaiserlich-Österreichischer Franz-Joseph-Orden) was founded by Emperor Franz Joseph I of Austria on 2 December 1849, on the first anniversary of his accession to the imperial throne.

== Classes ==
The order was originally awarded in three classes: Grand Cross, Commander's Cross, and Knight's Cross. In 1869, the class of Commander with Star was added, which ranked immediately below the Grand Cross. The Officer's Cross, which ranked between Commander and Knight, was introduced on 1 February 1901.

The order ceased to exist as a governmental award with the dissolution of the Austro-Hungarian Empire in 1918. It was not re-established with the foundation of the Republic of Austria. It has been revived as of 2017 by Sandor Habsburg-Lothringen as a private association.

== Recipients ==
The order was for general merit. It was often awarded to senior State officials. It was particularly conferred upon the Ambassadors from the Imperial Court.

Ribbon bars
| Grand Cross	| Commander with Star (1869)	| Commander	| Officer (1901)	| Knight/Dame

== Description ==
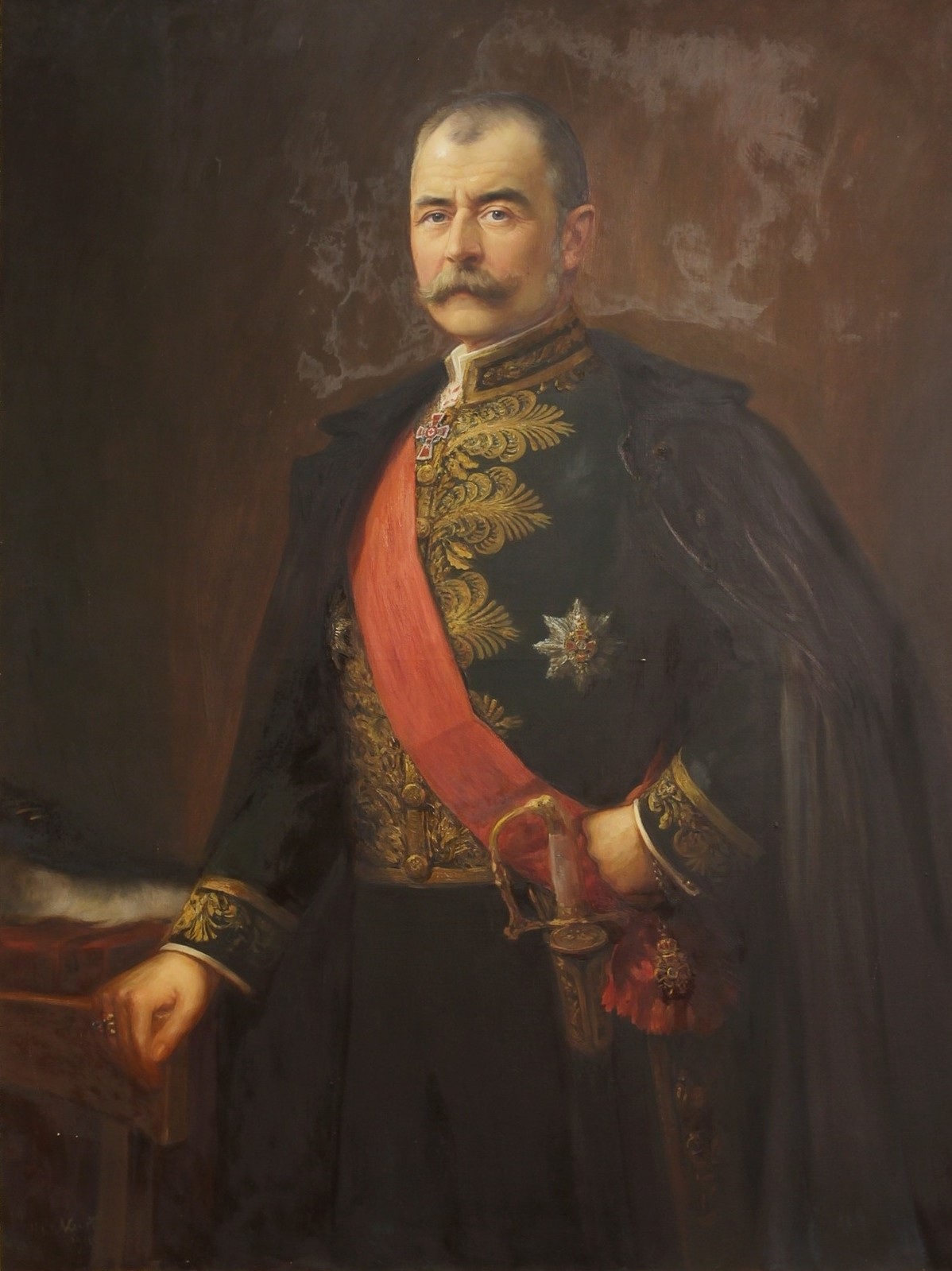
Grand Cross of the Order of Franz Joseph

Knights wore the decoration suspended from a triangular ribbon on the left breast. Officers wore it on the left breast without a ribbon. Commanders wore the decoration at the neck, as did Commander with Star, who also wore a breast star. The Grand Cross was worn suspended from the shoulder and also came with a breast star. The ribbon of all classes of the order was plain red for civilians but the order was also awarded with the ribbon of the bravery medal in the case of military merit.

As was common with other Austro-Hungarian awards of the period, the Order of Franz Joseph was further awarded with the addition of the War decoration (in the form of a laurel wreath) and Swords which could be awarded for military merit. However, if soldiers were honoured, it was usually for distinguished service as opposed to gallantry in the face of the enemy.

== Notable recipients ==
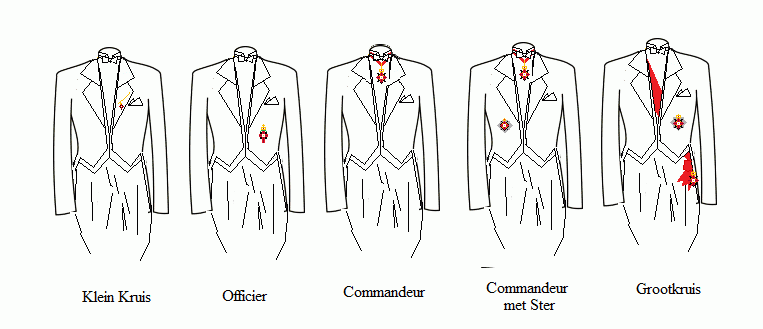
The five classes of the order and their respective insignia

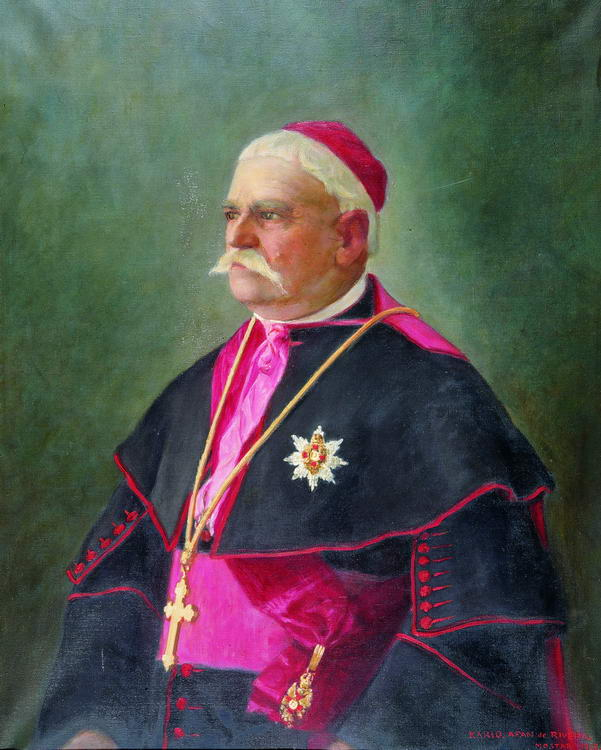
Bishop Paškal Buconjić wearing the Grand Cross of the Order of Franz Joseph

- Pakubowono X
- Živojin Mišić
- Émile Baudot
- Benjamin Thomas Brandreth-Gibbs
- Anton Bruckner
- Paškal Buconjić
- Georg Decker, portrait artist
- Carl Fürstenberg
- Abraham Salomon Camondo
- Nezir Škaljić
- Baron Carl Gustaf Emil Mannerheim
- Baron Adrien Goffinet
- Prince Julius Eisner Von Eisenhof
- Hans Gude
- Carl von In der Maur
- Constantin Isopescu-Grecul
- Ndre Mjeda
- Gjergj Fishta
- Alois Jirásek (1898)
- Hussein Kamel of Egypt
- Auguste, Baron Lambermont
- Jan Matejko
- Johann Münzberg
- Alexander Marmorek
- Philipp Sarlay
- Napoleon Touzet
- Anton Dreher
- Anton Dreher Jr.
- Julius Epstein
- Karl Samuel Grünhut
- Marie Simon
- Alfred Meyer-Waldeck

== See also ==
- Order of chivalry
- Order of Leopold (Austria)
- Order of the Iron Crown (Austria)
- Orders, decorations, and medals of Austria-Hungary
