= Franz Haller =

Hungarian politician (1796–1875)

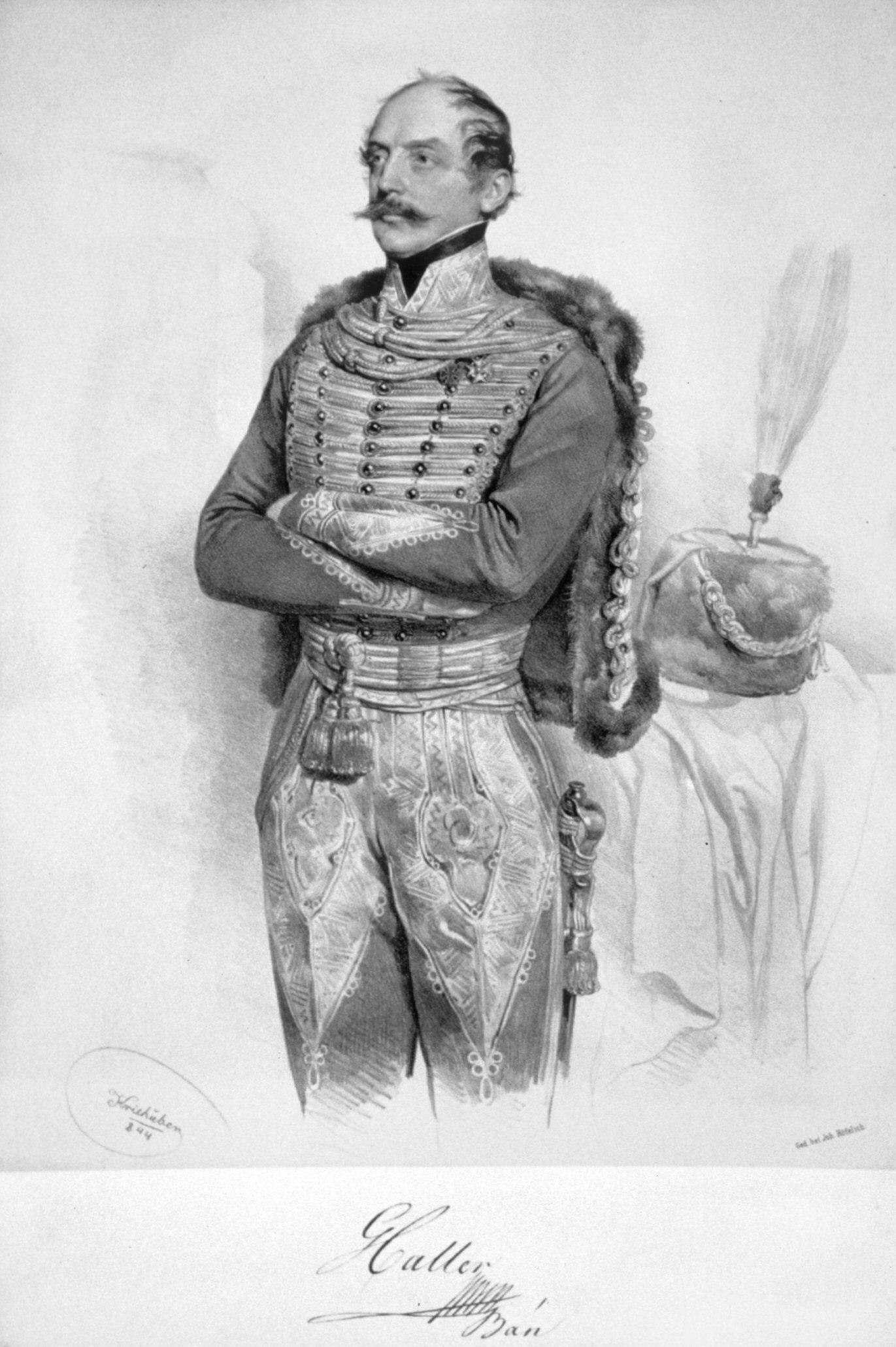
Franjo Haller

Ferenc Haller, count Haller von Hallerkeö (24 March 1796 – 5 March 1875) was a Hungarian politician. He served as ban of Croatia-Slavonia between 1842 and 1845 during the Croatian national revival and the Illyrian movement in the 1830s and 1840s.

Haller was born in Kerelőszentpál, Transylvania, as a member of the Hungarian-Transylvanian branch of the Haller von Hallerstein family. He was promoted by emperor Ferdinand I of Austria as ban on 16 June 1842 and was later promoted to lieutenant general. He took office on 18 October. Haller was brought in to carry on Magyarization in Croatia. In 1843, the use of the Illyrian name was banned. In large part due to the July victims incident, in which thirteen protesters were killed in Zagreb, Haller resigned his post and continued his military career in the Austrian Empire. Bishop Juraj Haulik became ban soon after.

In 1845 Haller donated 500 forint for building the Croatian National Theatre in Zagreb.
