= Ante Starčević =

Croatian politician and writer (1823–1896)

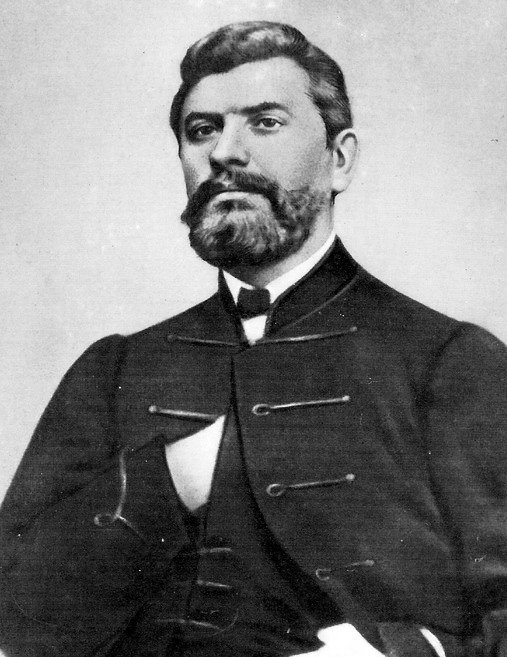
- Born: 23 May 1823; Veliki Žitnik, Gospić, Croatian Military Frontier, Austrian Empire
- Died: 28 February 1896 (aged 72); Zagreb, Croatia-Slavonia, Austria-Hungary
- Resting place: Šestine, Zagreb
- Education: University of Pécs
- Occupations: Politician, writer
- Political party: Party of Rights (until 1895); Pure Party of Rights (1895–1896)

Ante Starčević (pronounced [ǎːnte stǎːrt͡ʃeʋit͡ɕ]; 23 May 1823 – 28 February 1896) was a Croatian politician and writer. His policies centered around Croatian state law, the integrity of Croatian lands, and the right of his people to self-determination. As an important member of the Croatian parliament and the founder of the Party of Rights he has laid the foundations for Croatian nationalism. He has been referred to as Father of the Nation due to his campaign for the rights of Croats within Austria-Hungary and his propagation of a Croatian state in a time when many politicians sought unification with other South Slavs.

== Biography ==
=== Life ===
Starčević was born in the village of Veliki Žitnik near Gospić, a small town in the Military Frontier within the Austrian Empire, to a Catholic Croat father Jakov and Orthodox Serb mother Milica (née Čorak). Other sources claim that his father comes from the village which was inhabited by Catholised Serbs, and he is a descendant of the Herzegovian Starčević family. Starčević's formative years were influenced by his uncle Šime Starčević, a Catholic priest with strong Illyrian sympathies who supported the brief Napoleonic occupation of Dalmatia and compiled an Illyrian–French dictionary. From the age of thirteen to sixteen, his educational foundation was formed by Šime's teachings, including Latin and the Shtokavian Croatian dialect.

In 1845, he graduated from Classical Gymnasium in Zagreb. He then briefly continued his studies at the seminary in Senj, but soon moved to Pest in 1845 to attend a Roman Catholic theological seminary, graduating in 1846. Upon his graduation Starčević returned to Croatia and continued studying theology in Senj. Rather than becoming a priest, he decided to engage in secular pursuits and started working at Ladislav Šram's law firm in Zagreb. He then tried to get an academic post with the University of Zagreb but was unsuccessful, so he remained in Šram's office until 1861 when he was appointed chief notary of Fiume County. That same year, he was elected to the Croatian Parliament as the representative of Fiume and founded the original Croatian Party of Rights with Eugen Kvaternik. He was also a member of the committee of Matica ilirska, a Croatian cultural society connected with the Illyrian movement, in the Historical Society and in the editorial board of Neven, a literary magazine. Starčević would be reelected to the parliament in 1865, 1871, and from 1878 until his death.

In 1862, when Fiume was implicated in participation in protests against the Austrian Empire, he was suspended and sentenced to one month in prison as an enemy of the regime. In 1871 he was arrested again following the Rakovica revolt that was launched by Kvaternik, which sought independence from Habsburg rule. The revolt drew both Serb and Croat peasants but was quashed after three days by Imperial troops. Despite having nothing to do with the rebellion, the authorities imprisoned Starčević and abolished the Party of Rights. He spent 75 days in prison; after his release he worked as a clerk in the law office of his relative, David Starčević. The two were first cousins once removed: David's grandfather (also named David) and Ante's father Jakov were brothers. Regardless, David referred to Ante as "uncle", and Ante referred to David as "nephew" and historiography generally accepted those labels.

In his old age, he moved to Starčević House (Croatian: Starčevićev dom), built for him by the Croatian people in 1895. He died in his house less than a year later, aged 73. According to his wish, he was buried in the Church of St Mirko in the Zagreb suburb of Šestine. His bust was made by Ivan Rendić. On his deathbed, he requested that no monuments be raised to his honor, but his statue was put up in front of Starčević House in 1998.

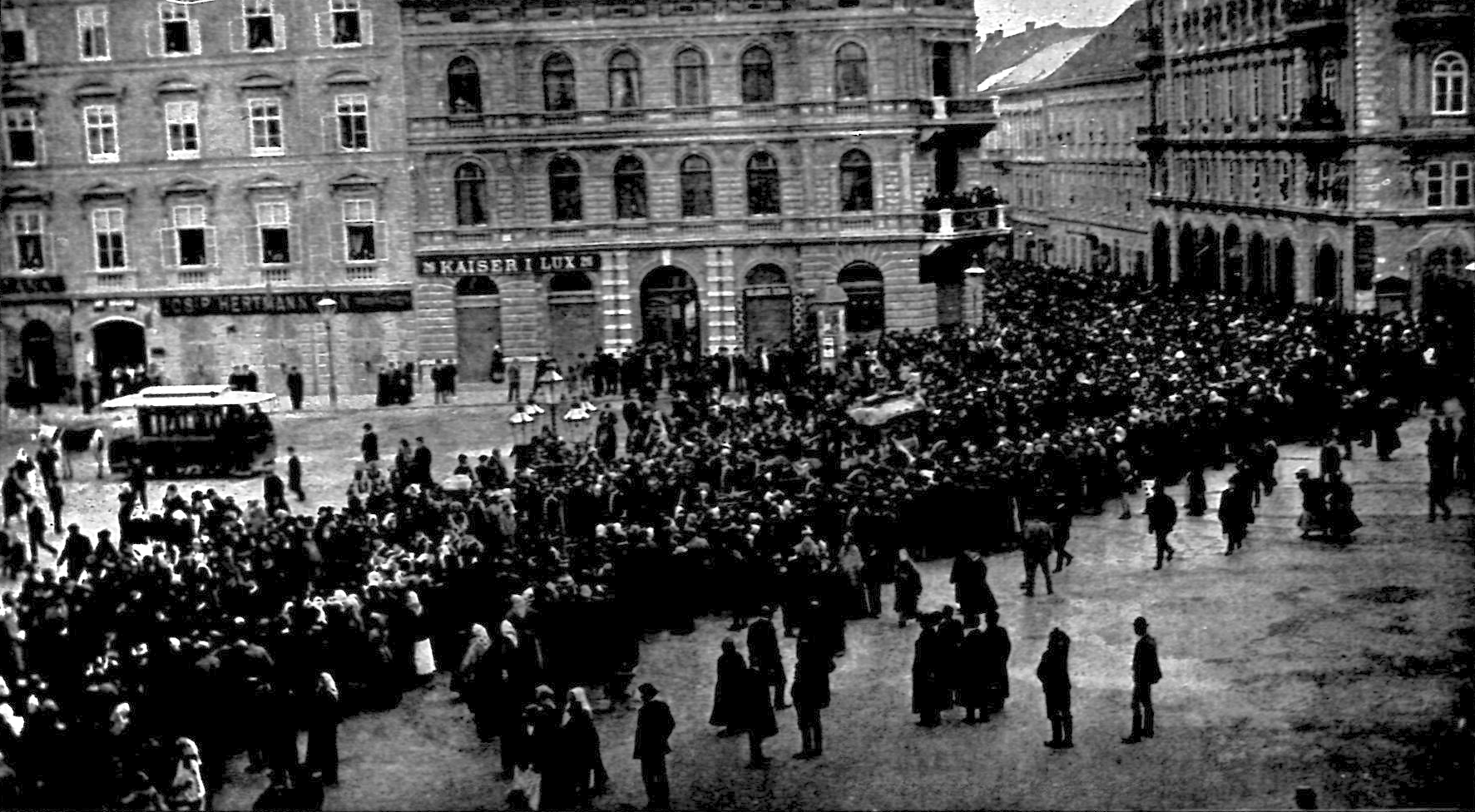
Ante Starčević's funeral procession, 1896

=== Political activity ===
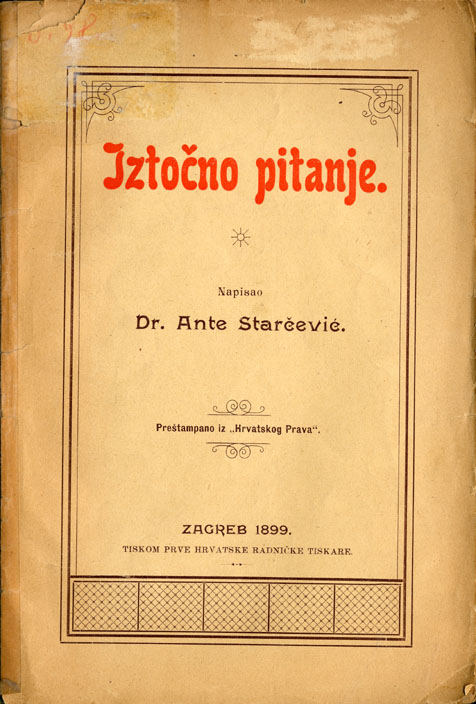
Starčević's political work Iztočno pitanje (Croatian for 'Eastern Question') published in 1899

By the 1850s Croatian ideologies of national identity were split between Yugoslavism, which grew upon the Illyrian movement and advocated for unity between South Slavs as a way to sustain the Croatian nation, and exclusive Croatian nationalism. Starčević and Kvaternik rejected the Yugoslav framework and deemed that a revolution like the French Revolution was necessary to liberate Croatia from Austrian control.

As the chief notary in Fiume in 1861, Starčević wrote "the four petitions of the Rijeka county". He pointed out that Croatia needed to determine its relationships with Austria and Hungary through international agreements. He demanded the reintegration of the Croatian lands, "the large kingdom of Croatia of old" (the medieval Kingdom of Croatia), the homeland of one people, "with the same blood, language, past and (God willing) future".

His desire for independence from Austria became the basis for his founding of the Party of Rights with Kvaternik. The party's initial slogan was: "Ni pod Beč, ni pod Peštu, nego za slobodnu, samostalnu Hrvatsku" (Croatian for 'Neither under Vienna nor under Pest, but for a free, independent Croatia'). Along with Kvaternik, he viewed Austria as the "sworn historic enemy" of the Croats, and did not accept Hungary's governing authority over Croatia. In achieving political goals, the party rejected any cooperation with Vienna or Budapest, or Serbs. The party therefore did little work in the parliament and gained a reputation for being difficult and unreasonable.

Starčević advocated the resolution of Bosnian issues by reforms and cooperation between the people and the nobility. Starčević believed that Bosniaks were "the best Croats", and claimed that "Bosnian Muslims are a part of the Croatian people and of the purest Croatian blood".

With the speech he held in the Parliament on 26 June 1861, Starčević initiated the campaign aimed at rehabilitation of Petar Zrinski and Fran Krsto Frankopan, executed in 1671 by Leopold I for the Magnate conspiracy.

From his first writings of 1861, until his last speech, Starčević tried to prove that the main and lasting thing was to get rid of Austrian intimidation and that for the Croatian people there was no life or happier future "until it's no longer under Austria-Hungary." He took up the hostile stance towards the "mindset called Austria, in which governments and rulers (...) conspired against the peoples."

Starčević saw the main Croatian enemy in the Habsburg monarchy. He believed in the ability of the Croatian people to govern themselves and that sovereignty grew from the nation, the people, and not from the ruler that governed "by the Grace of God". "God and Croats" was the essence of Starčević's political ideas. Under the influence of the ideas of the French Revolution, he fought against feudalism and advocated for the democratization of political life. In politics, he relied on townsmen, wealthier peasantry, and intellectuals.

=== Ideology ===
Starčević was at first a proponent of the Illyrian movement, later he adopted ideological views from the French period such as nationalism and liberalism. He developed his personal, as well as party ties around Croatian nationalism, liberalism in regards to freedom and liberties of peoples and nations, religious pluralism and parliamentary monarchism. He espoused the idea of a Greater Croatia that would spawn modern-day Croatia, Bosnia and Herzegovina, and Slovenia and viewed all South Slavs who inhabited the regions as Croats, regardless of their religion. For Starčević, Croatia included all the territory from the Alps in the north to Macedonia and the Bulgarian border to the south. The Bulgarians and Croats were the only South Slavic nations.

=== Literary and linguistic work ===
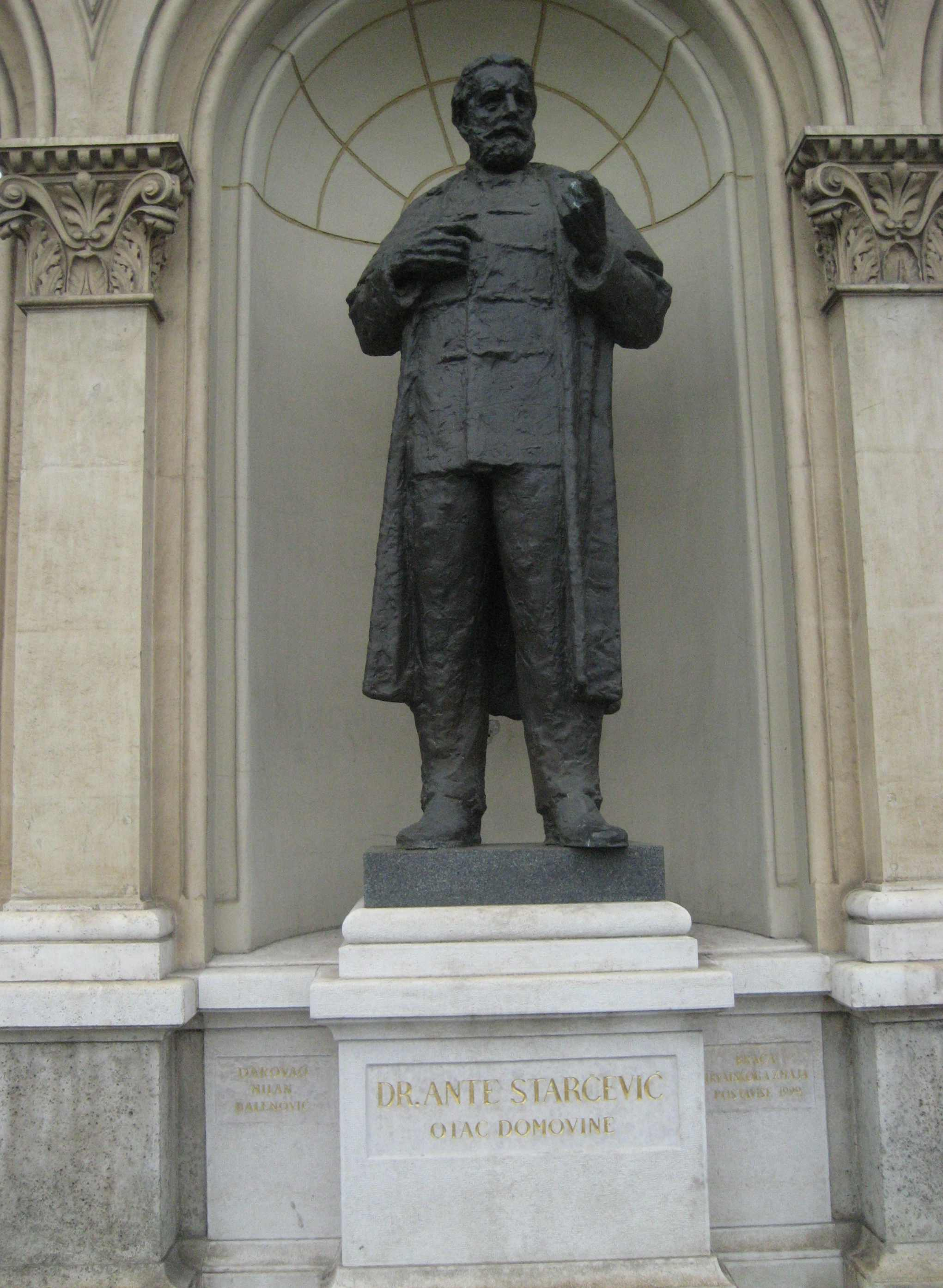
Monument of Ante Starčević in Zagreb

In addition to his political activities, Starčević was a theologian, philosopher and writer. He wrote literary criticisms, short stories, newspaper articles, political satire, philosophical essays and poems. He was also a translator.

His travelogue From Lika was published in Kušlan's magazine Slavenski Jug on 22 October 1848. He wrote four plays in the period 1851–52, but only the Village Prophet has been preserved. His translation of Anacreon from Ancient Greek was published in Danica ilirska in 1853. He provided critical reviews of Ignjat Đurđević's various poems.

In 1850, inspired by Ljudevit Gaj, Starčević started working on the manuscript of Istrian Demarcation, a Croatian document from 1325. He transcribed the text from the Glagolitic alphabet to the Latin alphabet, analysed it and published it in 1852. In the foreword, Starčević elaborated his linguistic ideas, specifically that the mixture of all three Croatian dialects (Shtokavian, Chakavian and Kajkavian) and the Frontier dialect, with its 600-year history, was the Croatian language. Starčević accepted the etymological orthography and used the Ekavian accent for his entire life, considering it the heir of the old Kajkavian. He did not use assibilation, coarticulation nor assimilation, accepted in Croatian orthography since Ljudevit Gaj. His orthography was adopted by the Ustasha regime in the Independent State of Croatia (NDH). His language is a "synthetic" form of Croatian, never used before or after him, most similar to the Ozalj idiom of Petar Zrinski, whom he probably never read.

Starčević stated his opposition to the Vienna Language Agreement of 1850 in which Serb and Croat linguists agreed on a foundation of a Serbo-Croatian language based on the Shtokavian dialect. He also opposed the linguistic concepts of Vuk Stefanović Karadžić and published articles attacking his proposals. Starčević denied the existence of a Serb identity and therefore advocated for a Croatian language. His position mirrored Karadžić's from the opposite end, as Karadžić viewed all Shtokavian speakers as Serbs while Starčević viewed them all as Croats.

When Srbski dnevnik from Novi Sad published an article saying that "Croatians write in Serbian", Starčević wrote in response: "Instead of claiming that the Croats use anything else but the Croatian language, those writers who consider themselves Serbs (or whatever they like) would do well to write in the educated and pure Croatian language, like some of them are already doing, and they can call their language Coptic for all I care." He published the reply as an unsigned article in Narodne novine, the newspaper of Ljudevit Gaj, so the Serbian side attacked Gaj, wrongly attributing the article to him. Starčević subsequently proclaimed he was the author, not Gaj, who cared to maintain good relations with Serbia, distanced himself from his friend.

Starčević was the only Croatian politician from his era respected by writer Miroslav Krleža. Krleža used to compare Starčević's struggles to those of Don Quixote's. For Miroslav Krleža, Starčević has been the most intelligent Croatian politician. Krleža, however, did not pay much attention to political aspects of his works.

In 1869, he published an affirmative article on the Ottoman Empire and Islam.

== Assessment ==
Starčević promoted the "principle of nationality", according to which every nation must have a state. Starčević advocated Croatia's independence from the Austrian Empire and viewed Austria as a "sworn historical enemy", but did not support the use of force. For him, there was only one Croatian state right, which belonged to the Croatian people. This became the central constituent of his ideology. He saw the foundations of the new state in the ideas of the French Revolution, and supported universal suffrage.

Starčević rejected the terms "Illyrian" or "Yugoslav", and insisted on the name "Croatian" for his people. He viewed the Illyrian movement as a tragic error. He considered that there were only two South Slavic nations: Croats and Bulgarians, and envisioned Croatia from the Alps to Macedonia. He called Slovenes as Alpine Croats, Serbs simply as Croats, and Bosnian Muslims as the purest part of the Croatian nation. Some authors, such as Serbian writer Jovan Skerlić, interpreted this as in fact an advocacy of Yugoslavism. Some view Starčević as anti-Serb.

Starčević fiercely condemned all those who thought differently from him. He coined the term "Slavoserb", derived from the Latin words "sclavus" and "servus", for those who function as servants to foreign powers and against their own people. He applied that term to people such as Ljudevit Gaj, Bishop of Bosnia or Đakovo and Syrmia Josip Juraj Strossmayer, and Ban of Croatia Ivan Mažuranić. It was applied to persons who were both Croats and Serbs. He also pointed out Nikola IV Zrinski and Josip Jelačić as servants to foreigners, and named the participants of the Magnate conspiracy as their opposite. He wrote positively about the Serbian Nemanjić dynasty. However, he accordingly claimed they were a Croatian dynasty.

The term "Slavoserbianism" did not refer to the Serbs as a nation, but persons and groups that were "politically servile". The misinterpretation of Starčević's views by the Pure Party of Rights, which split off from Starčević's Party of Rights and was led by Josip Frank, and later by the Ustasha movement, incorrectly implied that Starčević was anti-Serb. Starčević used the terms "breed" and "unclean blood" for "Slavoserbs", for which some labeled him a racist. However, he applied the term based on what he perceived as anti-Croatian actions, rather than someone's ethnic origin. The Croatian-Jewish historian Mirjana Gross writes that Starčević's ideology "did not allow biological racism". The historian Nevenko Bartulin writes that Starčević's views on race were "confused and contradictory because they were in theoretical opposition to his idea of a civic Croatian state", although his "recourse to racial ideas and language is significant to [the] discussion on the development of racial theory in late nineteenth-century Croatia". He introduced the idea of non-Slav and Vlach origin of most Serbs in Croatia and Bosnia, and Croat blood origin of the Bosnian Muslims, which became a key component of Ustasha racial ideology. However, he did not argue that Croats were racially superior to other groups but that they were an "exceptional and unique" people. The historian Ivo Goldstein wrote that those who allege Starčević's racism and anti-Serbianism either falsify or distort his ideological positions. Goldstein also wrote that in modern political terms, Starčević would probably be a kind of progressive or liberal.

According to the historian Sabrina P. Ramet, Starčević "was interested in building up a state of equal citizens (a “citizens' state”) and not in constructing an exclusivist ideology on the basis of either national or religious homogeneity". According to the historian Jozo Tomasevich: "Despite his many exaggerations, inconsistencies, and gross mistakes of fact, Starčević was by far the most important political thinker and ideologist in Croatia during the second half of the nineteenth century". He also wrote that "with respect to both independence and anti-Serbianism, the Ustashas cannot be taken as the heirs to Starčević's ideology." Goldstein writes that the Ustashas tried to portray Starčević as their forerunner and founder, but were completely different from Starčević, and writes: "The NDH had nothing to do with Croatian political traditions or previous political conceptions (not even those of Ante Starčević). There is a huge difference between Ante Starčević and Ante Pavelić, in fact an abyss, in every sense." According to writer and journalist Marcus Tanner, Starčević was "grossly misinterpreted" by those that later claimed to be his followers, and that it is "hard to imagine him bestowing approval on Pavelić's Nazi puppet state". The historian Sabrina P. Ramet echoes this reflection.

== Starčević and the Catholic Church ==
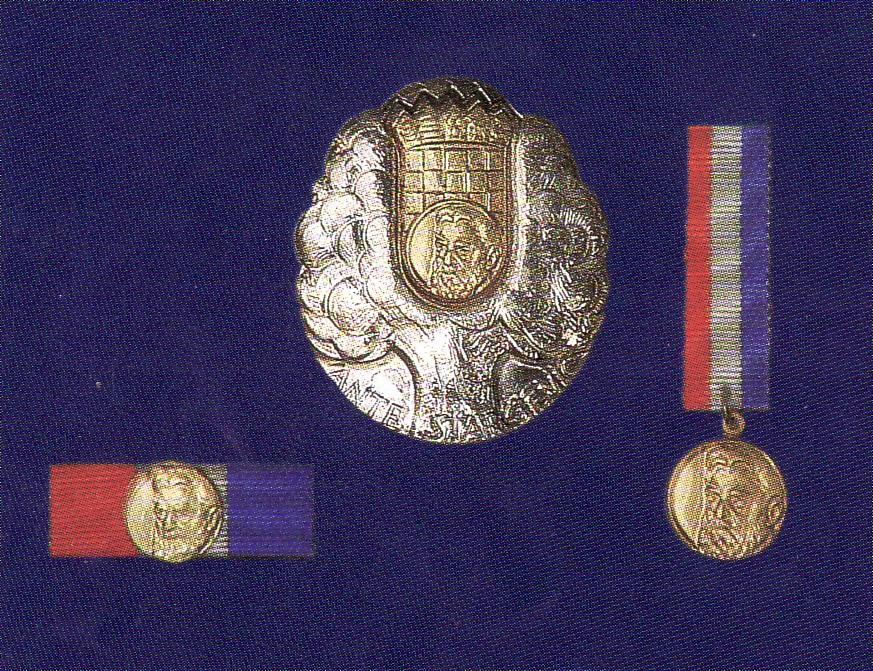
Order of Ante Starčević, decoration of Croatia for contribution and development in creation of Croatian state and Croatia statehood idea

Starčević espoused secularist views: he advocated the separation of church and state, and argued that faith should not guide the political life, and that the insistence on religious differences is harmful to the national interests. He sharply criticized the Roman Catholic clergy in Croatia due to the fact that it sided with his political opponents. He saw the Croatian Catholic clergy as servants of foreign masters who were instrumental in enslaving and destroying Croatian people on behalf of Austrian and Hungarian interests. At the same time, Starčević was not an atheist: he believed that a civilized society could not exist without faith in God and the immortal soul, which is why he saw atheists as untrustworthy.

He and the Bishop of Bosnia or Đakovo and Syrmia, Josip Juraj Strossmayer, disagreed about Croatian politics. Strossmayer was sympathetic towards panslavic unity of South Slavs (future Yugoslavia). Starčević, on the other hand, demanded an independent Croatian state and opposed any solution that would include Croats within some other multi-ethnic country.

== Legacy ==
Croatian writer Antun Gustav Matoš wrote a tractate about him. In it, he proclaims Starčević as the greatest Croat and the greatest patriot in the 19th century. He also describes Starčević as the greatest Croatian thinker. For his political and literary work, Starčević is commonly called Father of the Nation (Croatian: Otac domovine) among Croats, a name first used by Eugen Kvaternik while Starčević was still alive. His portrait was depicted on the obverse of the Croatian 1000 kuna banknote, issued in 1993.

Many streets and squares are named after Starčević; in 2008, a total of 203 streets in Croatia were named after him, making him the sixth most common person eponym of streets in the country. There are also schools named after him. Most right-wing parties in Croatia claim his politics as their legacy.

== See also ==
- Order of Ante Starčević
- Stjepan Radić
