= Brezik =

Brezik may refer to:

- Brezik (Brčko), a village in Bosnia and Herzegovina
- Brezik, Kalesija, a village in Bosnia and Herzegovina
- Brezik (Srebrenik), a village in Bosnia and Herzegovina
- Brezik, Vareš, a village in Bosnia and Herzegovina
- Brezik Našički, a village near Našice, Croatia
- Brezik, Lika-Senj County, a village near Gospić, Croatia
- Brezik, Lukač, a village near Lukač, Virovitica-Podravina County, Croatia
- Brezik, Nova Bukovica, a village near Nova Bukovica, Virovitica-Podravina County, Croatia
