= Pavlovac =

Pavlovac can refer to several places:

In Bosnia and Herzegovina

- Pavlovac, Banja Luka
- Pavlovac, Pale
- Pavlovac (fortress)

In Croatia

- Pavlovac, Bjelovar-Bilogora County, a village in the Veliki Grđevac municipality
- Pavlovac, Karlovac County, a suburb of Slunj
- Pavlovac Vrebački, a village near Gospić

In Serbia

- Pavlovac (Topola), a village in the Topola municipality
- Pavlovac (Vranje), a suburb of Vranje in southern Serbia
