= Velika Plana (disambiguation) =

Velika Plana is a town and municipality in the Podunavlje District, Serbia.

Velika Plana may also refer to:

- Velika Plana, Croatia, a village near Gospić
- Velika Plana (Prokuplje), a village in Toplica District, Serbia

== See also ==
- Mala Plana (disambiguation)
