= Mala Plana =

Mala Plana may refer to:

== Croatia ==
- Mala Plana, Croatia, a village near Gospić

== Serbia ==
- Mala Plana (Smederevska Palanka), a village in Podunavlje District
- Mala Plana (Prokuplje), a village in Toplica District

== See also ==
- Velika Plana (disambiguation)
