= Kruščica, Croatia =

Kruščica
- Village
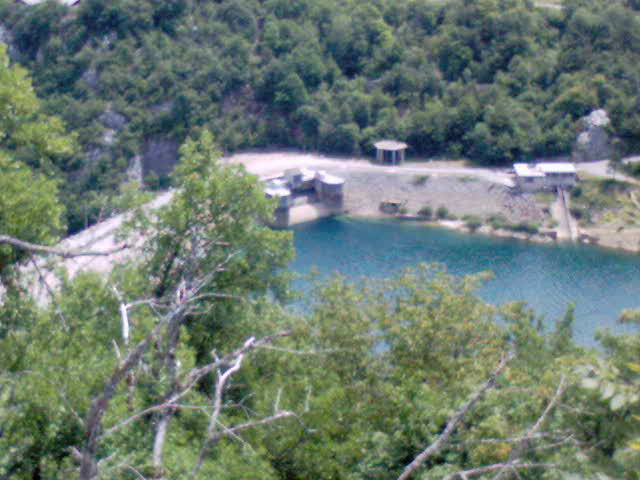
- Interactive map of Kruščica
- Location within Croatia
- Coordinates: 44.68137°N 15.25110°E
- Country: Croatia
- County: Lika-Senj
- Municipality: Gospić

Area
  - Total: 4.03 sq mi (10.43 km^{2})

Population (2021)
  - Total: 0
  - Density: 0.0/sq mi (0.0/km^{2})
- Time zone: UTC+1 (CET)
  - Summer (DST): UTC+2 (CEST)

Kruščica is an unpopulated village in the City of Gospić, Croatia. It is connected by the D50 and D25 roads, and is located west of Lake Kruščica.
