= Klanac =

Klanac may refer to several places:

- In Bosnia and Herzegovina
  - Klanac, Kakanj
  - Klanac, Trnovo
- In Croatia
  - Klanac, Gospić
  - Klanac, Vrbovsko
