= Bužim (disambiguation) =

Bužim is a town in Bosnia and Herzegovina.

Bužim may also refer to:

- Bužim Lake, a lake in Bosnia
- Bužim, Croatia, a village near Gospić
