= Kruškovac =

Kruškovac may refer to:

- Kruškovac (drink), a type of liqueur
- Kruškovac, Croatia, a village near Gospić
