= Barlete =

- Village
- Interactive map of Barlete
- Location within Croatia
- Coordinates: 44.53446°N 15.46914°E
- Country: Croatia
- Region: Lika
- County: Lika-Senj
- Municipality: Gospić

Area
  - Total: 5.73 sq mi (14.85 km^{2})

Population (2021)
  - Total: 21
  - Density: 3.7/sq mi (1.4/km^{2})
- Time zone: UTC+1 (CET)
  - Summer (DST): UTC+2 (CEST)

Barlete is a village in the City of Gospić, Croatia. It is connected by the D50 road.
