= Vaganac =

- Village
- Interactive map of Vaganac
- Location within Croatia
- Coordinates: 44.65159°N 15.26315°E
- Country: Croatia
- Region: Lika
- County: Lika-Senj
- Municipality: Gospić

Area
  - Total: 3.22 sq mi (8.34 km^{2})

Population (2021)
  - Total: 27
  - Density: 8.4/sq mi (3.2/km^{2})
- Time zone: UTC+1 (CET)
  - Summer (DST): UTC+2 (CEST)

Vaganac is a village in the City of Gospić, Croatia. It is connected by the D50 and D25 roads.
