= Bilaj =

- Village
- Interactive map of Bilaj
- Location within Croatia
- Coordinates: 44.5192°N 15.43337°E
- Country: Croatia
- Region: Lika
- County: Lika-Senj
- Municipality: Gospić

Area
  - Total: 4.1 sq mi (10.5 km^{2})

Population (2021)
  - Total: 149
  - Density: 36.8/sq mi (14.2/km^{2})
- Time zone: UTC+1 (CET)
  - Summer (DST): UTC+2 (CEST)

Bilaj is a village in the City of Gospić, Croatia. It is connected by the D50 road.

== History ==
Bilaj Castle is a medieval fortification located on a rocky hill in the centre of Bilaj. It is thought to have been built in the first half of the 15th century and was first mentioned in 1451 when Tomo Tvrtković transferred it to Petar Talovac.
