= Ostrvica, Lika-Senj County =

Ostrvica
- Village
- Interactive map of Ostrvica
- Location within Croatia
- Coordinates: 44.5608623°N 15.4522532°E
- Country: Croatia
- Region: Lika
- County: Lika-Senj
- Municipality: Gospić

Area
  - Total: 9.95 sq mi (25.78 km^{2})

Population (2021)
  - Total: 49
  - Density: 4.9/sq mi (1.9/km^{2})
- Time zone: UTC+1 (CET)
  - Summer (DST): UTC+2 (CEST)

Ostrvica is a village in the City of Gospić, Croatia. It is connected by the D25 and D50 roads.
