= Popovača Pazariška =

- Village
- Interactive map of Popovača Pazariška
- Location within Croatia
- Coordinates: 44.63376°N 15.17705°E
- Country: Croatia
- Region: Lika
- County: Lika-Senj
- Municipality: Gospić

Area
  - Total: 3.75 sq mi (9.70 km^{2})

Population (2021)
  - Total: 77
  - Density: 21/sq mi (7.9/km^{2})
- Time zone: UTC+1 (CET)
  - Summer (DST): UTC+2 (CEST)

Popovača Pazariška is a village in the City of Gospić, Croatia. It is connected by the D50 and D25 roads.
