= Kalinovača =

- Village
- Interactive map of Kalinovača
- Location within Croatia
- Coordinates: 44.62063°N 15.19502°E
- Country: Croatia
- County: Lika-Senj
- Municipality: Gospić

Area
  - Total: 6.34 sq mi (16.43 km^{2})

Population (2021)
  - Total: 99
  - Density: 16/sq mi (6.0/km^{2})
- Time zone: UTC+1 (CET)
  - Summer (DST): UTC+2 (CEST)

Kalinovača is a village in the City of Gospić, Croatia. It is connected by the D50 and D25 roads.
