= Kukljić =

- Village
- Interactive map of Kukljić
- Location within Croatia
- Coordinates: 44.42185°N 15.52386°E
- Country: Croatia
- County: Lika-Senj
- Municipality: Gospić

Area
  - Total: 13.80 sq mi (35.75 km^{2})

Population (2021)
  - Total: 11
  - Density: 0.80/sq mi (0.31/km^{2})
- Time zone: UTC+1 (CET)
  - Summer (DST): UTC+2 (CEST)

Kukljić is a village in the City of Gospić, Croatia. It is connected by the D50 road.
