= Ribnik =

Ribnik may refer to:

== Places ==
- Ribnik, Bosnia and Herzegovina, a municipality near Ključ
- Ribnik, Croatia, a village near Karlovac
- Ribnik, Bulgaria, a village near Petrich
- Ribnik (Jagodina), a village in Serbia
- Ribnik, Semič, a remote abandoned settlement in southern Slovenia
- Lički Ribnik, a village near Gospić, Croatia

== Rivers ==
- Ribnik (river) in Bosnia.
- Erenik, or the Ribnik River in Kosovo.
