= Žabica, Croatia =

Žabica
- Village
- Interactive map of Žabica
- Location within Croatia
- Coordinates: 44.53151°N 15.35978°E
- Country: Croatia
- Region: Lika
- County: Lika-Senj
- Municipality: Gospić

Area
  - Total: 1.20 sq mi (3.11 km^{2})

Population (2021)
  - Total: 189
  - Density: 157/sq mi (60.8/km^{2})
- Time zone: UTC+1 (CET)
  - Summer (DST): UTC+2 (CEST)

Žabica is a village in the City of Gospić, Croatia. It is connected by the D50 and D25 roads.
