= Rastoka =

Rastoka may refer to the following places:

- Rastoka, Bosnia and Herzegovina, a village near Ključ
- Rastoka, Croatia, a village near Gospić
- Rastoka, Montenegro, a village near Bijelo Polje

== See also ==
- Ráztoka in Slovakia
- Rastoke
