= Novoselo Bilajsko =

- Village
- Interactive map of Novoselo Bilajsko
- Location within Croatia
- Coordinates: 44.51573°N 15.41999°E
- Country: Croatia
- Region: Lika
- County: Lika-Senj
- Municipality: Gospić

Area
  - Total: 3.15 sq mi (8.17 km^{2})

Population (2021)
  - Total: 117
  - Density: 37.1/sq mi (14.3/km^{2})
- Time zone: UTC+1 (CET)
  - Summer (DST): UTC+2 (CEST)

Novoselo Bilajsko is a village in the City of Gospić, Croatia. It is connected by the D50 road.
