= Vrebac =

Vrebac may refer to:

- Vrebac, Croatia, a village near Gospić
- Sanjin Vrebac (born 2000), Austrian footballer
