= Otes =

Otes may refer to:

- Otes Manor, in High Laver, England
- Otes, Bosnia and Herzegovina, a section of Ilidža
- Oteš, a village near Gospić, Croatia
