= Vranovine =

- Village
- Interactive map of Vranovine
- Location within Croatia
- Coordinates: 44.63168°N 15.27637°E
- Country: Croatia
- Region: Lika
- County: Lika-Senj
- Municipality: Gospić

Area
  - Total: 1.08 sq mi (2.79 km^{2})

Population (2021)
  - Total: 27
  - Density: 25/sq mi (9.7/km^{2})
- Time zone: UTC+1 (CET)
  - Summer (DST): UTC+2 (CEST)

Vranovine is a village in the City of Gospić, Croatia. It is connected by D50 and D25 roads.
