= Smiljan, Croatia =

Smiljan
- Village
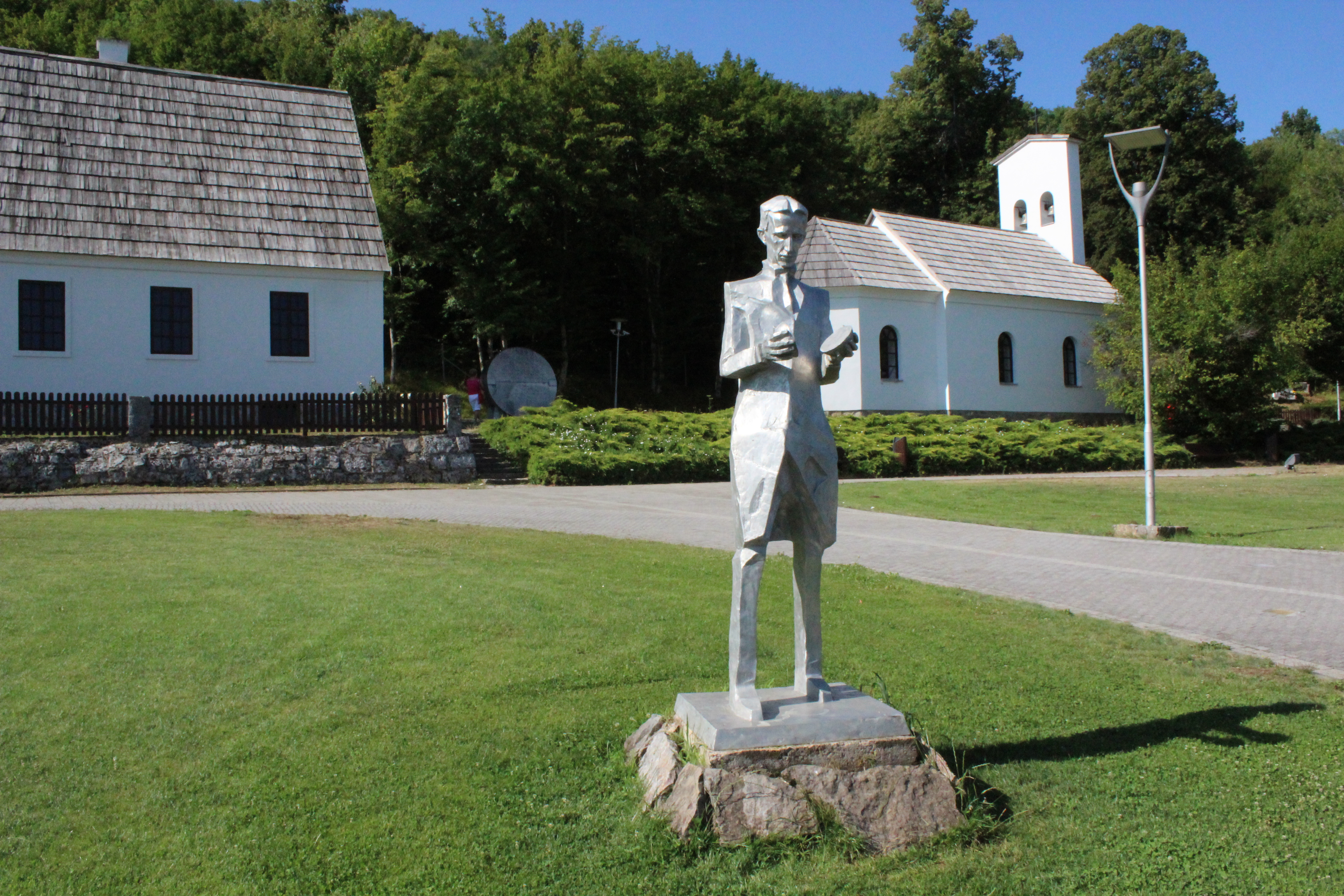
- Statue of Nikola Tesla at the Nikola Tesla Memorial Center in Smiljan
- Interactive map of Smiljan
- Location of Smiljan within Croatia
- Coordinates: 44°34′N 15°19′E
- Country: Croatia
- County: Lika-Senj County
- Municipality: Gospić

Area
  - Total: 19.9 km^{2} (7.7 sq mi)

Population (2021)
  - Total: 392
  - Density: 19.7/km^{2} (51.0/sq mi)
- Time zone: UTC+1 (CET)
  - Summer (DST): UTC+2 (CEST)
- Postal code: 53211 Smiljan
- Area code: +053

Smiljan (pronounced [smîʎan]) is a village in the mountainous region of Lika in Croatia. It is located 6 km (3.7 mi) northwest of Gospić, and fifteen kilometers from the Zagreb-Split highway; its population is 418 (2011). Smiljan is best known for being the birthplace of inventor and engineer Nikola Tesla.

== Geography ==
It consists of eighteen scattered hamlets (Baćinac, Bogdanić, Čovini, Debelo Brdo, Dražica, Kolakovica, Kovačevići, Ljutača, Milkovića Varoš, Miljača, Miškulin Brdo, Podkrčmar, Rasovača, Rosulje, Smiljan, Smiljansko Polje, Vaganac).

Smiljan resort is located in the central part of the Velebit-Lika plain, on the western edge of the field at the foot of the Krčmar hill. It consists of twelve villages which makes the spatial and functional unit.

In the surroundings are Hill-forts Bogdanić, Smiljan and Krčmar, prehistoric tombs, the churches of St. Anastasia, St. Mark and St. Vitus. It got its name from fort Smiljan the ruins of which are located on Vekavac hill.

== Etymology ==
The origin of the name Smiljan is not fully certain. It is commonly believed to be derived from smilje, the name for the Helichrysum plant. However, Croatian linguist Petar Šimunović believed Smiljan is patronymic in origin. Another hypothesis focuses on milja, Croatian for "mile", present in other toponyms such as Miljača hill, which suggests a connection with a nearby merchant road.

== History ==
The oldest traces of settlement at Smiljan date from the Middle and Late Bronze Age. On the hillfort Miljac was situated a necropolis, numerous remains of Iapodian culture were found in the area.

The area of Smiljan was controlled by the Ottoman Empire between 1527–1686, after the Ottomans were expelled by counts Jerko Rukavina and Dujam Kovačević. Until that time the Ottoman aghas, Rizvan and Zenković, from Novi near Gospić had estates in Smiljan, Bužim and Trnovac.

After the defeat of the Ottomans in Lika, Roman Catholic Bunjevci migrated to Lika, including Smiljan between 1683–87. A 1700 church register listed 17 Serbian Orthodox families in the village, who had settled during the Great Turkish War. Villages and hamlets in Lika and Krbava were divided according to religious confession, the Serbian Orthodox minority lived in the hamlets of Selište, Ljutača and Bogdanić at that time.

In 1708 the Roman Catholic parish of Our Lady of Mount Carmel was founded. There is a small chapel, Immaculate Conception of the Virgin Mary. The Serbian Orthodox church of St. Peter and Paul was built in 1765; it is now a branch of a parish in Gospić. The re-construction of the Catholic parish church of Our Lady of Mount Carmel was started in 1860, and finished 1864. In 1830 a minor school was founded.

During World War II, the town was occupied by Axis troops and was included into the Pavelić's Independent State of Croatia (NDH). The fascist Ustashe regime committed the Genocide of the Serbs and the Holocaust. The house in which the inventor Nikola Tesla was born, as well as the Serbian Orthodox church in which his father had served as a priest, were destroyed by the Ustashe movement in 1941. During the same period, the Ustaše also established a concentration camp in Smiljan through which 5,000 inmates passed. The camp was part of a wider network of Ustaše death camps centred around the town of Gospić. Members of Tesla’s family were killed by the Ustaše as part of these death camps.

== Demography ==
The village of Smiljan (with Brušane and Oštarije) was incorporated to the Croatian Military Frontier only in 1713 (after being separated from the city of Karlobag), and subsequently registered in the 1712/14 census done in Lika and Krbava. In 1712/14 there were 1,405–1,536 people, with 1,153–1,283 people land owners, 117 landless (with Brušane), with average 1.33 acre per individual, 120–139 families who were land owners, with average 9.6 members in family.Most of them were Roman Catholic Vlachs ie Bunjevci (1,312), then Serbian Orthodox Vlachs (208), and Carniolians (16). There were 103 Roman Catholic, and 17 Serbian Orthodox families.

Some of the most numerous families (actually kind of tribe-collective) in Lika and Krbava were in Smiljan; of count and captain Nikola Rukavina Bevandić (56 members), Dujam Kovačević (50), Ivan Devčić (46), Mijat Lemajić (40), Juriša Pavičić (40), Milanko Pejnović (40), Petar Serdar (40), Ilija Brkljačić (30), and Anton Tomljenović (30).

In 1746 there lived 2,149 people, with 2,144 people land owners, and 290 families of land owners.

206 houses existed in 1830, with 1,880 people, of whom 1,401 Roman Catholic, and 479 Orthodox faith. After some settlements got separated, in 1857 numbered only 110 houses with 1,132 people, of whom 535 Roman Catholic and 597 Orthodox faith, with further separation, in 1910 the hamlet numbered only 50 people, however whole municipality had 2,286 people, of whom 1,698 Roman Catholic, and 588 Orthodox faith.

Population number according census
1857	1869	1880	1890	1900	1910	1921	1931	1948	1953	1961	1971	1981	1991	2001	2011
2,090	2,365	1,973	1,222	1,283	1,162	1,127	1,068	747	818	835	761	605	555	446	418

Note: In 1869 and 1880 contains data for villages Rastoka (Gospić) and Smiljansko Polje, while in 1857 part of data for Smiljansko Polje.

A nearby village of Smiljansko Polje ("Field of Smiljan") has 135 residents (2011).

== Tesla memorial complex ==
Commemorating the 150th anniversary of the birth of the electricity pioneer and inventor Nikola Tesla, a Tesla memorial complex was opened, including a museum inside his restored childhood home. Today, Tesla's birth house, together with the Serbian Orthodox church of St. Peter and Paul (built in 1765) and the surrounding area, make up a memorial complex. There are various exhibits of Tesla's inventions and a museum where the details of the inventor's life are shown. There is also a congress hall in a nearby building. The original memorial complex was built in 1956.

In 1992, during the Croatian War of Independence, several of the buildings were severely damaged by fire due to shelling. The Croatian authorities restored the complex and reopened it in a 2006 ceremony, with the highest dignitaries of Croatia and Serbia attending, as well as the US ambassador at the time.

== Notable people ==
- Nikola Tesla (1856–1943) – Croatian Serb inventor and electrical engineer. He migrated to the United States in 1884.
- Ferdinand Kovačević (1838–1913) – inventor, engineer, and pioneer in telegraphy
- Edo Kovačević (1906–1993) – artist, member of the Croatian Academy of Sciences and Arts, and recipient of the Vladimir Nazor Award
- Kata Pejnović (1899-1966) – Croatian Serb feminist and politician

== Bibliography ==
- Grahovac-Pražić, Vesna; Vrcić-Mataija, Sanja (2010). "Ojkonimi gospićkog područja" (PDF). Folia onomastica Croatica (in Croatian) (19): 81–96.
- Roksandić, Drago (2003). Triplex Confinium, ili o granicama i regijama hrvatske povijesti 1500–1800 (PDF) (in Croatian). Zagreb: Barbat. ISBN 953-181-051-6.
- Šarić, Marko (2009), "Predmoderne etnije u Lici i Krbavi prema popisu iz 1712./14.", in Željko Holjevac (ed.), Identitet Like: Korijeni i razvitak (PDF) (in Croatian), vol. 1, Zagreb: Institut društvenih znanosti Ivo Pilar, pp. 325–384, ISBN 978-953-6666-65-2
