= Zavođe =

- Village
- Interactive map of Zavođe
- Location within Croatia
- Coordinates: 44.52439°N 15.52638°E
- Country: Croatia
- Region: Lika
- County: Lika-Senj
- Municipality: Gospić

Area
  - Total: 0.49 sq mi (1.27 km^{2})

Population (2021)
  - Total: 1
  - Density: 2.0/sq mi (0.79/km^{2})
- Time zone: UTC+1 (CET)
  - Summer (DST): UTC+2 (CEST)

Zavođe is a village in the City of Gospić, Croatia. It is connected by the D50 road.
