= Rizvanuša =

- Village
- Interactive map of Rizvanuša
- Location within Croatia
- Coordinates: 44.49109°N 15.30232°E
- Country: Croatia
- Region: Lika
- County: Lika-Senj
- Municipality: Gospić

Area
  - Total: 3.46 sq mi (8.96 km^{2})

Population (2021)
  - Total: 18
  - Density: 5.2/sq mi (2.0/km^{2})
- Time zone: UTC+1 (CET)
  - Summer (DST): UTC+2 (CEST)

Rizvanuša is a village in the City of Gospić, Croatia. It is connected by the D25 road.
