= Aleksinica =

Settlement in Lika-Senj County, Croatia

- settlement
- Interactive map of Aleksinica
- Location within Croatia
- Coordinates: 44°38′24″N 15°15′04″E
- Country: Croatia
- County: Lika-Senj
- City: Gospić

Area
  - Total: 10.4 km^{2} (4.0 sq mi)

Population (2021)
  - Total: 105
  - Density: 10.1/km^{2} (26.1/sq mi)
- Time zone: UTC+1 (CET)
  - Summer (DST): UTC+2 (CEST)
- Postal code: 53000 Gospić
- Area code: +385 (0)53

Aleksinica is a settlement in the City of Gospić in Croatia. In 2021, its population was 105.

== Demographics ==
Aleksinica: Population trends 1857–2021
v

population	681			569	735	393	295	500	669	586	481	457	272	258	220	169	105
	1857	1869	1880	1890	1900	1910	1921	1931	1948	1953	1961	1971	1981	1991	2001	2011	2021

Sources: Croatian Bureau of Statistics publications
