= Veliki Žitnik =

- Village
- Interactive map of Veliki Žitnik
- Location within Croatia
- Coordinates: 44.59392°N 15.33963°E
- Country: Croatia
- Region: Lika
- County: Lika-Senj
- Municipality: Gospić

Area
  - Total: 3.49 sq mi (9.03 km^{2})

Population (2021)
  - Total: 31
  - Density: 8.9/sq mi (3.4/km^{2})
- Time zone: UTC+1 (CET)
  - Summer (DST): UTC+2 (CEST)

Veliki Žitnik is a village the City of Gospić, Croatia. It is connected by the D50 and D25 roads.
