= Smiljansko Polje =

- Village
- Interactive map of Smiljansko Polje
- Location within Croatia
- Coordinates: 44.58463°N 15.38200°E
- Country: Croatia
- Region: Lika
- County: Lika-Senj
- Municipality: Gospić

Area
  - Total: 6.55 sq mi (16.97 km^{2})

Population (2021)
  - Total: 128
  - Density: 19.5/sq mi (7.54/km^{2})
- Time zone: UTC+1 (CET)
  - Summer (DST): UTC+2 (CEST)

Smiljansko Polje is a village in the City of Gospić, Croatia. It is connected by the D50 road.
