= Pavlovac Vrebački =

- Village
- Interactive map of Pavlovac Vrebački
- Location within Croatia
- Coordinates: 44.51065°N 15.53955°E
- Country: Croatia
- Region: Lika
- County: Lika-Senj
- Municipality: Gospić

Area
  - Total: 5.08 sq mi (13.16 km^{2})

Population (2021)
  - Total: 39
  - Density: 7.7/sq mi (3.0/km^{2})
- Time zone: UTC+1 (CET)
  - Summer (DST): UTC+2 (CEST)

Pavlovac Vrebački is a village in the City of Gospić, Croatia. It is connected by the D50 road.
