= Mala Plana, Croatia =

Mala Plana
- Village
- Interactive map of Mala Plana
- Location within Croatia
- Coordinates: 44.65319°N 15.17149°E
- Country: Croatia
- County: Lika-Senj
- Municipality: Gospić

Area
  - Total: 3.53 sq mi (9.13 km^{2})

Population (2021)
  - Total: 34
  - Density: 9.6/sq mi (3.7/km^{2})
- Time zone: UTC+1 (CET)
  - Summer (DST): UTC+2 (CEST)

Mala Plana is a village in the City of Gospić, Croatia. It is connected by the D50 and D25 roads.
