= Ornice =

- Village
- Location of Ornice in Croatia
- Coordinates: 44°29′50″N 15°25′07″E
- Country: Croatia
- Region: Lika-Senj
- Municipality: Gospić

Area
  - Total: 3.0 km^{2} (1.2 sq mi)

Population (2021)
  - Total: 4
  - Density: 1.3/km^{2} (3.5/sq mi)
- Time zone: UTC+1 (CET)
  - Summer (DST): UTC+2 (CEST)

Ornice is a village in the Gospić municipality in the Lika region of central Croatia, Lika-Senj County. It is located near Gospić, connected by the D25 highway. The 2011 census registered 6 residents.

== Demographics ==
Historical population 1857-2011
v

population				159	167	146	155	164	96	100	85	71	54	55		6
	1857	1869	1880	1890	1900	1910	1921	1931	1948	1953	1961	1971	1981	1991	2001	2011

Sources: Croatian Bureau of Statistics publications

NOTE: The 1857-1880 population data is included in the population data for Divoselo.
