= Velika Plana, Croatia =

Velika Plana
- Village
- Interactive map of Velika Plana
- Location within Croatia
- Coordinates: 44.65847°N 15.14233°E
- Country: Croatia
- Region: Lika
- County: Lika-Senj
- Municipality: Gospić

Area
  - Total: 23.46 sq mi (60.76 km^{2})

Population (2021)
  - Total: 42
  - Density: 1.8/sq mi (0.69/km^{2})
- Time zone: UTC+1 (CET)
  - Summer (DST): UTC+2 (CEST)

Velika Plana is a village in the City of Gospić, Croatia. It is connected by the D50 and D25 roads.
