= Šime Starčević =

Croatian priest and linguist (1784–1859)

Šime Starčević (18 April 1784 – 14 May 1859) was a Croatian priest and linguist.

He was born in Žitnik, near Gospić. He worked as a pastor in Gospić, Lički Novi, Udbina, and since 1814 in Karlobag. He knew Latin, French, Italian and German, and could read Slavic languages. In 1812 he published in Trieste his Nòva ricsôslovica iliricska vojnicskoj mladosti krajicsnoj poklonjena and Nòva ricsôslovica iliricsko-francèzka ("A new Illyrian-French grammar"). His French grammar was revised and translated from German, using domestic terminology for linguistic terms. His grammar of "Illyrian" was the first Croatian grammar describing the four-accentual system of the Neoštokavian dialect.

== Works ==
Thirty years after publishing his grammar he again become active as a writer. He published Homilie ili tumačenje Sv. evanđelja (1850), Ričoslovje in sequels in Glasnik dalmatinski (1849–1850) and polemics on grammar in Zora dalmatinska (1844-1849). He advocated the use of a single dialect as the literary language, namely the Neoštokavian Ikavian, without dialectal mixing and without changes in the traditional orthographic practices.

He has been described as a keen debater, great linguistic purist, and the most consistent representative of the Ikavian literary language and the so-called "Slavonian orthography".

He died in Karlobag.
