= Vrebac, Croatia =

Vrebac
- Village
- Interactive map of Vrebac
- Location within Croatia
- Coordinates: 44.52414°N 15.50399°E
- Country: Croatia
- County: Lika-Senj
- Municipality: Gospić

Area
  - Total: 19.44 sq mi (50.35 km^{2})

Population (2021)
  - Total: 45
  - Density: 2.3/sq mi (0.89/km^{2})
- Time zone: UTC+1 (CET)
  - Summer (DST): UTC+2 (CEST)

Vrebac is a village in the City of Gospić, Croatia. It is connected by the D50 road.
