= Brezik, Lika-Senj County =

Brezik
- Village
- Interactive map of Brezik
- Location within Croatia
- Coordinates: 44.43872°N 15.50174°E
- Country: Croatia
- Region: Lika
- County: Lika-Senj
- Municipality: Gospić

Area
  - Total: 2.28 sq mi (5.90 km^{2})

Population (2021)
  - Total: 19
  - Density: 8.3/sq mi (3.2/km^{2})
- Time zone: UTC+1 (CET)
  - Summer (DST): UTC+2 (CEST)

Brezik is a village in the City of Gospić, Croatia. It is connected by the D50 road.
