= Mušaluk =

- Village
- Interactive map of Mušaluk
- Location within Croatia
- Coordinates: 44.60865°N 15.38711°E
- Country: Croatia
- County: Lika-Senj
- Municipality: Gospić

Area
  - Total: 6.85 sq mi (17.75 km^{2})

Population (2021)
  - Total: 173
  - Density: 25.2/sq mi (9.75/km^{2})
- Time zone: UTC+1 (CET)
  - Summer (DST): UTC+2 (CEST)

Mušaluk is a village in the City of Gospić, Croatia. It is connected by the D25 road.
