= Klanac, Lika-Senj County =

Klanac
- Village
- Interactive map of Klanac
- Location within Croatia
- Coordinates: 44.63346°N 15.29810°E
- Country: Croatia
- County: Lika-Senj
- Municipality: Gospić

Area
  - Total: 4.52 sq mi (11.71 km^{2})

Population (2021)
  - Total: 90
  - Density: 20/sq mi (7.7/km^{2})
- Time zone: UTC+1 (CET)
  - Summer (DST): UTC+2 (CEST)

Klanac is a village in the City of Gospić, Croatia. It is connected by the D50 and D25 roads.
