= Kata Pejnović =

Croatian feminist and politician (1899–1966)

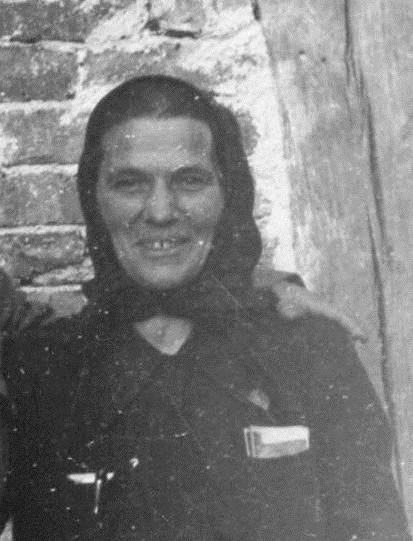
- Pejnović in 1942
- Born: Kata Bogić; 21 March 1899; Smiljan, Kingdom of Croatia-Slavonia, Austria-Hungary
- Died: 10 November 1966; Zagreb, Socialist Republic of Croatia
- Burial place: Tomb of the People's Heroes, Mirogoj Cemetery, Zagreb, Socialist Republic of Croatia
- Occupations: Feminist and politician
- Political party: Communist Party of Yugoslavia; Communist Party of Croatia

Kata Pejnović (née Bogić; 21 March 1899 – 10 November 1966) was a Croatian Serb feminist and politician.

== Life ==
Kata Pejnović was born on 21 March 1899 in the village of Smiljan near Gospić in the Kingdom of Croatia-Slavonia, then part of the Austro-Hungarian Empire, to a poor family. She completed her only formal education, elementary school, in 1911, before starting work to help feed her family.

Kata Pejnović became politically active in the local Communist movement from 1936 and was accepted into the Communist Party of Yugoslavia on 10 April 1938. Following the formation of the ‘anti-communist’ (fascist) Independent State of Croatia after the Axis invasion of Yugoslavia in April 1941, the Croatian fascists killed her husband and three sons in July.

In the communist party, Pejnović focused on reducing ethnic tensions between Serbs and Croats and women's issues. To help spread anti-fascist propaganda among the women of Croatia, she helped to found the first women's newspaper, Woman in Struggle (Žena u borbi), in partisan-controlled Croatia in March 1942. Later that year, she was the only woman delegate to the Anti-Fascist Council for the National Liberation of Yugoslavia (Croatian: Antifašističko vijeće narodnog oslobođenja Jugoslavije) in November and Pejnović was elected President of the Antifascist Women's Front (Antifašistički front žena) shortly afterwards. She was elected to the Central Committee of the Communist Party of Croatia in 1948 and repeatedly served in the Parliament of the People's Republic of Croatia and twice in the Federal Assembly.

Bedridden from 1963, she died three years later on 10 November 1966 in Zagreb. She was buried in the Tomb of the People's Heroes at Mirogoj Cemetery in Zagreb.

== Sources ==
- Brkljac̆ić, Maja (2005). "Pejnović, Kata". In Haan, Francisca de; Daskalova, Krassimira; Loutfi, Anna (eds.). Biographical Dictionary of Women's Movements and Feminisms in Central, Eastern, and South Eastern Europe: 19th and 20th Centuries. New York: Central European University Press. ISBN 978-963-7326-39-4.
