= Ferdinand Kovačević =

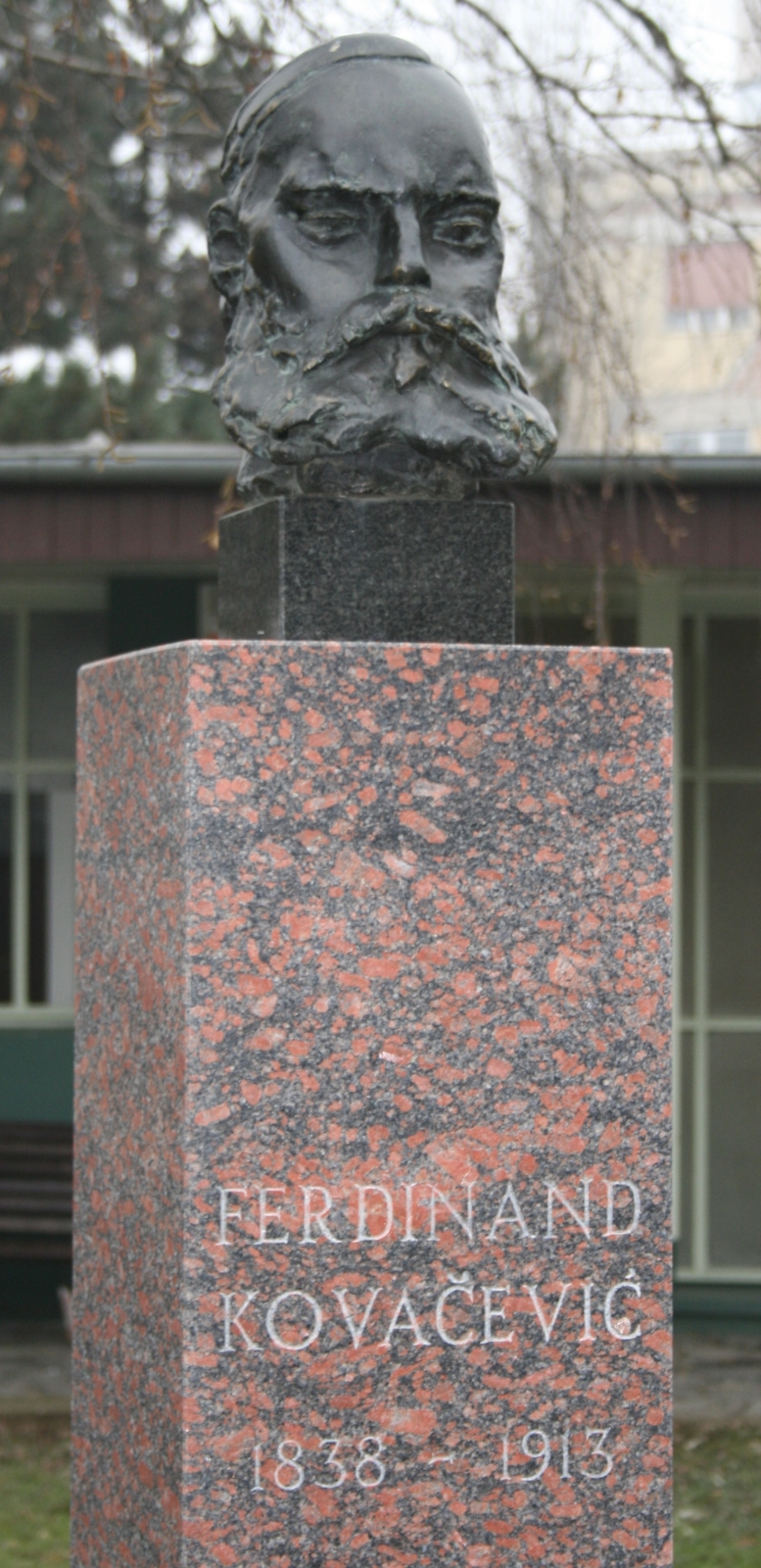
Bust of Kovačević at the Technical Museum in Zagreb, set in 1999

Ferdinand Kovačević (21 April 1838– 27 May 1913) was an inventor, engineer, and pioneer in telegraphy who originated from Gospić (actually near Smiljan) in modern-day Croatia. He invented the duplex connection of telegraphic transmission, patented in 1876 in Vienna and Budapest.

He died in Zagreb on 27 May 1913.

His son was the painter, Ferdo Kovačević.
