= Drenovac Radučki =

- Village
- Location within Croatia
- Coordinates: 44°24′N 15°34′E
- Country: Croatia
- County: Lika-Senj
- Municipality: Gospić

Area
  - Total: 12.8 km^{2} (4.9 sq mi)

Population (2021)
  - Total: 0
  - Density: 0.0/km^{2} (0.0/sq mi)
- Time zone: UTC+1 (CET)
  - Summer (DST): UTC+2 (CEST)

Drenovac Radučki is an uninhabited settlement in the Gospić municipality in the Lika region of central Croatia.

== Demographics ==
Historical population 1857-2011
v

population	338	337	277	344	428	435	446	437	381	355	283	263	179	126	1
	1857	1869	1880	1890	1900	1910	1921	1931	1948	1953	1961	1971	1981	1991	2001	2011

Sources: Croatian Bureau of Statistics publications
