= Ličko Polje =

Karstic field in Croatia

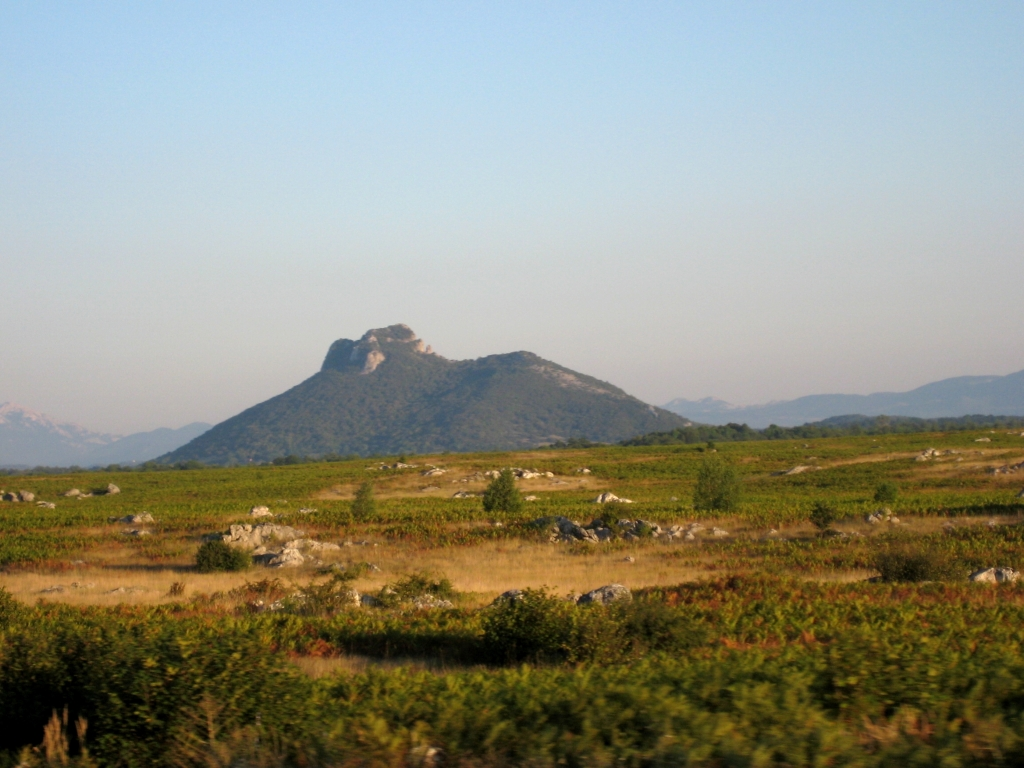
- The mountain of Zir lies in Ličko Polje

- Location within Croatia
- Floor elevation: 565–590 m (1,854–1,936 ft)
- Area: 465 km^{2} (180 mi^{2})

Geography
- Country: Croatia
- State/Province: Lika-Senj County
- Population center: Gospić
- Borders on: Velebit (west); Lika range (east)
- Coordinates: 44.5786°N 15.3445°E
- Mountain range: Dinaric Alps
- Rivers: Lika; Ričina
- Interactive map of Ličko Polje

Ličko Polje (lit. 'Field of Lika') is a polje (karstic field) in the Lika region, located in Croatia. Being the largest in Croatia, the field covers an area of 465 km^{2}, and consists of five smaller fields: Lipovo, Kosinjsko, Pazariško, Brezovo and Gospićko.

The field is characterized by some inselbergs, among them Zir (852 m), Otež (745 m) and Debeljak (882 m). The population is engaged in crops and farming. Largest settlement is Gospić.
