= Lički Ribnik =

- Village
- Interactive map of Lički Ribnik
- Location within Croatia
- Coordinates: 44.4865997°N 15.4543316°E
- Country: Croatia
- County: Lika-Senj
- Municipality: Gospić

Area
  - Total: 5.98 sq mi (15.50 km^{2})

Population (2021)
  - Total: 73
  - Density: 12/sq mi (4.7/km^{2})
- Time zone: UTC+1 (CET)
  - Summer (DST): UTC+2 (CEST)

Lički Ribnik is a village in the City of Gospić, Croatia. It is connected by the D50 road.
