= Brezik, Vareš =

Village in Vareš, Bosnia and Herzegovina

Brezik
- Village
- Location within Bosnia and Herzegovina
- Coordinates: 44.1469058°N 18.3326572°E
- Country: Bosnia and Herzegovina
- Entity: Federation of Bosnia and Herzegovina
- Canton: Zenica-Doboj
- Municipality: Vareš

Area
  - Total: 0.61 sq mi (1.58 km^{2})

Population (2013)
  - Total: 48
  - Density: 79/sq mi (30/km^{2})
- Time zone: UTC+1 (CET)
  - Summer (DST): UTC+2 (CEST)

Brezik is a village in the municipality of Vareš, Bosnia and Herzegovina.

== Demographics ==
According to a 2013 census, its population was 48.

Ethnicity in 2013
Ethnicity	Number	Percentage
Croats	44	91.7%
Serbs	2	4.2%
Bosniaks	1	2.1%
other/undeclared	1	2.1%
Total	48	100%
