= Kruškovac, Croatia =

Settlement in Lika-Senj County, Croatia

Kruškovac
- Settlement
- Interactive map of Kruškovac
- Location of Kruškovac in Croatia
- Coordinates: 44°25′54″N 15°34′03″E
- Country: Croatia
- County: Lika-Senj
- City: Gospić

Area
  - Total: 8.3 km^{2} (3.2 sq mi)

Population (2021)
  - Total: 7
  - Density: 0.84/km^{2} (2.2/sq mi)
- Time zone: UTC+1 (CET)
  - Summer (DST): UTC+2 (CEST)
- Postal code: 53000 Gospić
- Area code: +385 (0)53

Kruškovac is a settlement in the City of Gospić in Croatia. In 2021, its population was 7.

== Demographics ==
Kruškovac: Population trends 1857–2021
v

population	195	205	209	231	252	239	225	235	211	213	182	140	120	85	11	20	7
	1857	1869	1880	1890	1900	1910	1921	1931	1948	1953	1961	1971	1981	1991	2001	2011	2021

Sources: Croatian Bureau of Statistics publications
