= Rastoka, Croatia =

Rastoka
- Village
- Interactive map of Rastoka
- Location within Croatia
- Coordinates: 44.59783°N 15.27977°E
- Country: Croatia
- Region: Lika
- County: Lika-Senj
- Municipality: Gospić

Area
  - Total: 1.28 sq mi (3.32 km^{2})

Population (2021)
  - Total: 29
  - Density: 23/sq mi (8.7/km^{2})
- Time zone: UTC+1 (CET)
  - Summer (DST): UTC+2 (CEST)

Rastoka is a village in the City of Gospić, Croatia. It is connected by the D25 road.
