= Lički Novi =

- Village
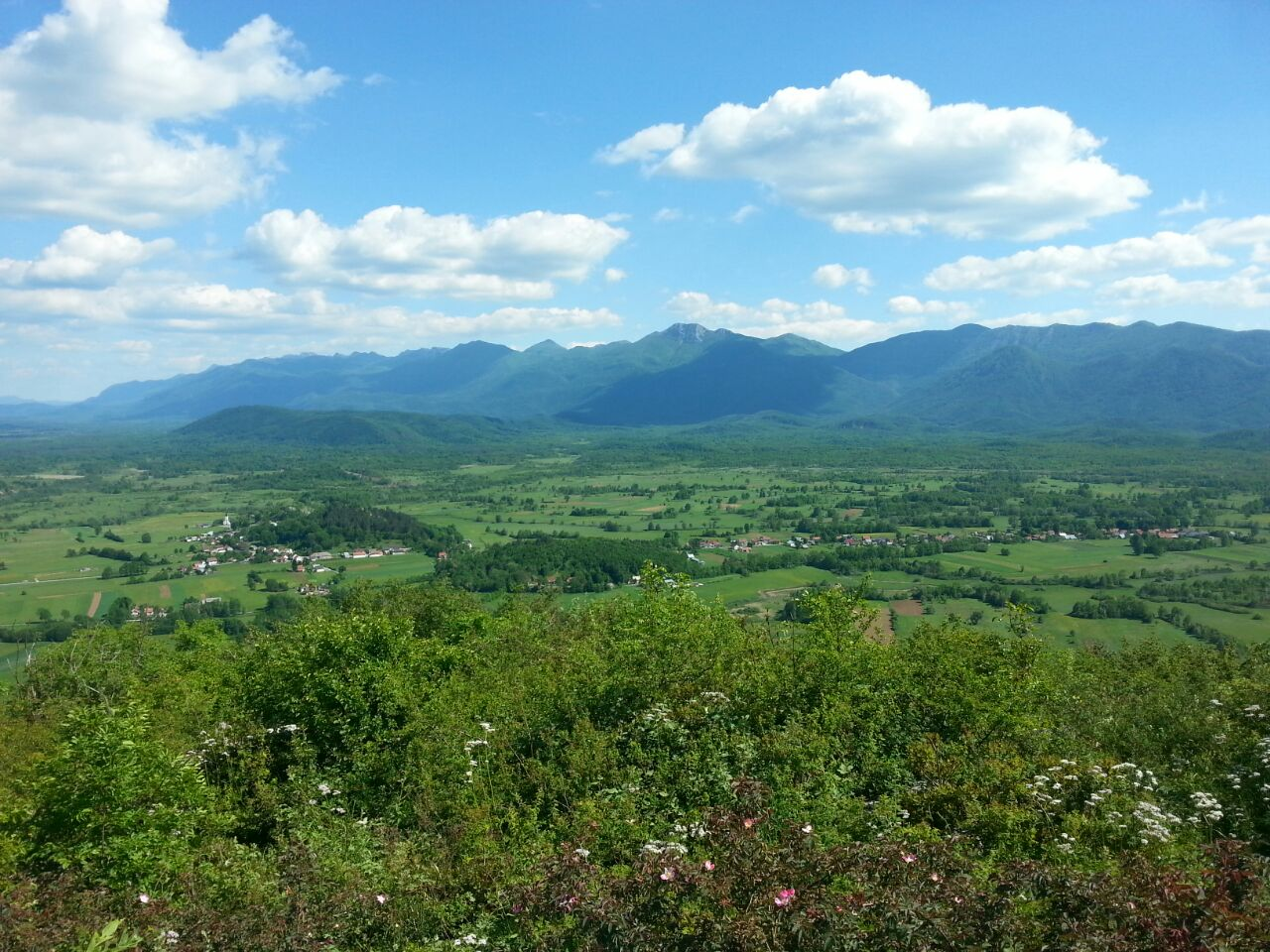
- Interactive map of Lički Novi
- Location within Croatia
- Coordinates: 44.5165467°N 15.3338284°E
- Country: Croatia
- County: Lika-Senj
- Municipality: Gospić

Area
  - Total: 4.65 sq mi (12.04 km^{2})

Population (2021)
  - Total: 260
  - Density: 56/sq mi (22/km^{2})
- Time zone: UTC+1 (CET)
  - Summer (DST): UTC+2 (CEST)

Lički Novi (lit. 'Novi of Lika') is a village in the City of Gospić, Croatia. It is connected by the D25 road.

== History ==
There is a church in Lički Novi called the Church of St. Anthony of Padua, which was built in 1690.
