= Gospić =

- Town
- Grad Gospić; Town of Gospić
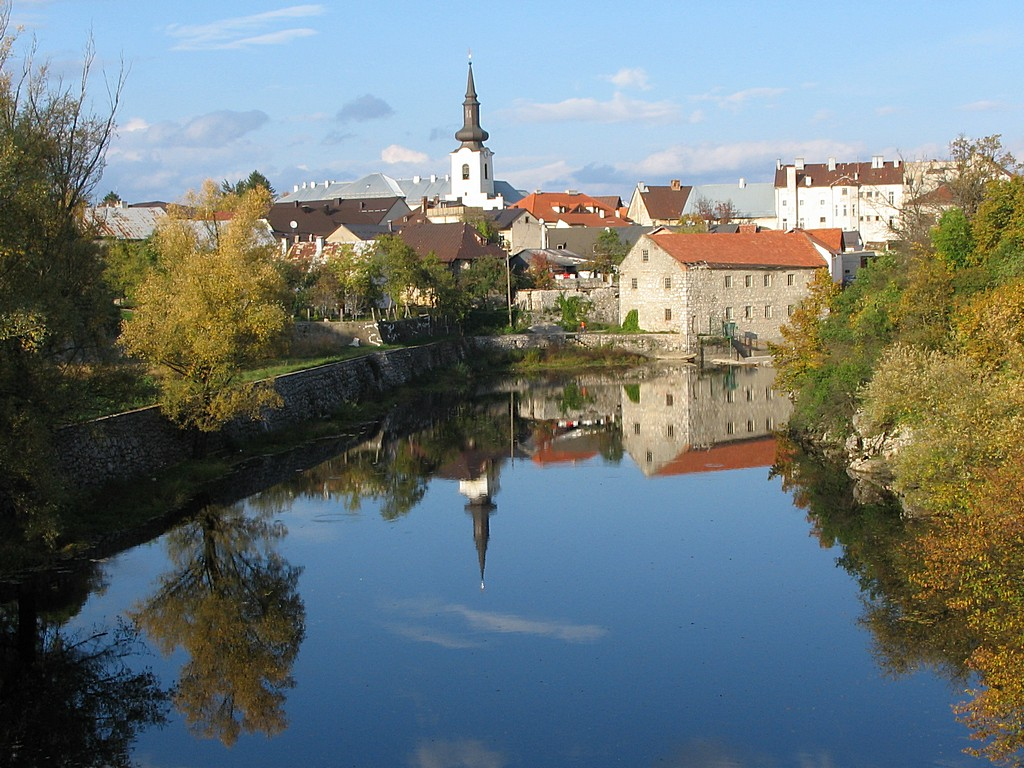
- View of Gospić

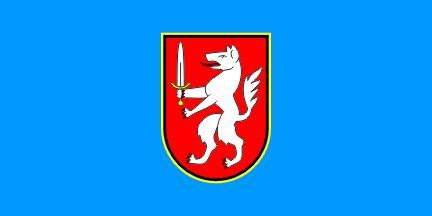
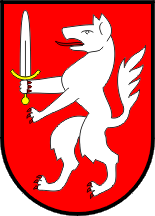
- Flag Coat of arms
- Interactive map of Gospić
- Location of Gospić within Croatia
- Coordinates: 44.546°N 15.375°E
- Country: Croatia
- Region: Mountainous Croatia (Lika)
- County: Lika-Senj County

Government
  - Mayor: Darko Milinović (LiPO)

Area
  - Town: 967.4 km^{2} (373.5 sq mi)
  - Urban: 21.4 km^{2} (8.3 sq mi)
- Elevation: 656 m (2,152 ft)

Population (2021)
  - Town: 11,502
  - Density: 11.89/km^{2} (30.79/sq mi)
  - Urban: 6,362
  - Urban density: 297/km^{2} (770/sq mi)
- Time zone: UTC+01 (CET)
- Postal code: 53 000
- Area code: 053
- Vehicle registration: GS
- Website: gospic.hr

Gospić (pronounced [ɡǒːspitɕ]) is a town in Lika, Croatia. It is the seat of the Lika-Senj County. It is located in the mountainous region of Lika, one of the least densely populated areas of the country, and lies along important inland transport routes connecting northern and southern Croatia.

The city serves as a local economic, cultural, and administrative hub for the surrounding rural settlements. Gospić has historical significance dating back to earlier periods of regional development in Lika, and today it is known for its quiet environment, natural surroundings, and proximity to national parks and mountainous landscapes.

== History ==
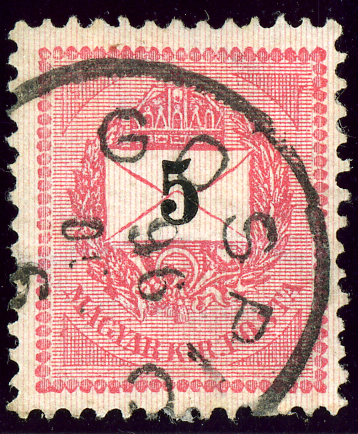
Kingdom of Hungary stamp cancelled in 1896

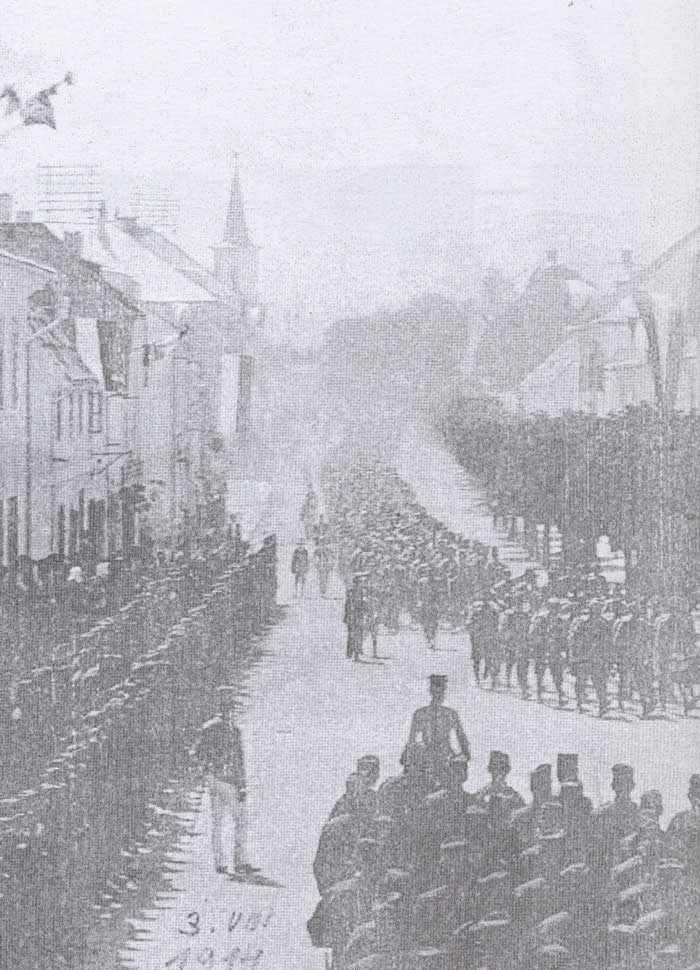
Soldiers from the 79th Infantry Regiment (K.u.K. Otočaner Infaterie-regiment Graf Jellačić), known as the “Jelačićevci” marching through Gospić in 1914.

The area of Gospić and its surroundings has been inhabited since prehistoric times. This is evidenced by numerous archaeological finds, especially those of the Iron Age tribe of the Iapodes.

Even before the arrival of the Croats, this area was inhabited by an indigenous population consisting of descendants of the Iapods and Roman settlers who ruled Lika, which was part of the Roman Empire.

The first organised inhabitation of the area was recorded in 1263 as Kaseg or Kasezi. The name Gospić is first mentioned in 1604, which likely originates from the Croatian word for "lady" (gospa) or another archaic form, gospava.

During the Ottoman wars in Europe, Gospić was for a time ruled by the Ottoman Empire as part of Sanjak of Lika initially in Rumeli Eyalet (1528–1580), later in Bosnia Eyalet (1580–1686). Today's town was built around two Ottoman forts (the towers of Aga Senković and of Aga Alić).

The Turkish incursion was repelled by the end of the 17th century and Gospić became an administrative centre of the Lika region within the Croatian Military Frontier, a section of the Habsburg monarchy organized as defense against the Ottomans. Before 1850, there are references to the town as Gospich in German. Since this time, there's been a significant population of ethnic Serbs in the Gospić region.

Politician and writer Ante Starčević was born in 1823 in the village of Veliki Žitnik near Gospić. In Croatia he has been referred to as Father of the Nation.

Scientist and inventor Nikola Tesla, of Serb descent, was born in the nearby village of Smiljan and grew up in Gospić between 1862 and 1870, when he moved to Karlovac. He returned to Gospić in 1873, before living with maternal family in Tomingaj for a year, briefly returning to Gospić in 1875 before he went to Graz.

In the 19th century, Gospić was the headquarters of Military Frontier "Likaner Regiment" N° I. Following the compromise of 1867, it became part of the Kingdom of Croatia-Slavonia. In the late 19th century and early 20th century, Gospić was part of the Lika-Krbava County.

In 1926, an HKD Napredak branch was founded by the Lička štedionica in Gospić.

During the Genocide of Serbs in the Independent State of Croatia in WWII, the district of Gospić experienced the first large-scale massacres which occurred in the Lika region, as some 3,000 Serb civilians were killed between late July and early August 1941. A concentration camp was established in Gospić in which (together with other camps that belonged to the same complex) the Ustaše might have killed between 24,000-42,000 people, most of them being Serbs and Jews, but some of the prisoners were also Croatian.

On April 4, 1945, Yugoslav Partisan units killed several hundred people without trial after entering the city. The remains of 253 Croatian victims of World War II and the post-war period were buried in a common grave in 2024, where 102 victims killed at locations in the area of the city of Gospić have already been buried in 2021.

In the Gospić area, the Chetniks were extremely strong during the war. After the end of WWII Yugoslav authority undertook radical actions to destroy remaining Chetnik groups, especially in Lika area. One of the radical methods was forced displacement of Serbs from the area of Gospić.

In the 1990s, during the course of the Croatian War of Independence, Gospić suffered greatly during the Battle of Gospić. After Vukovar, Gospić was the most devastated Croatian city. On February 3, 1991, preparations for the conquest of Gospić began. A "rally of all Serbs of Lika and the world" was held in Gospić; it was a gathering of rebel Serbs (about 5,000 of them) and preparations for the capture of Gospić. The town was held by Croatian government forces throughout the war, while the rebel Serb forces of the Republic of Serbian Krajina occupied positions directly to the east and often bombarded the town from there. In addition to the Yugoslav People's Army (JNA) and local rebel Serbs, the "White Eagles" and special units from Niš were active in the city itself. On August 5, 1991, a Chetnik group from Raduče took five people from Lovinac in an unknown direction. After a week, the police found their butchered bodies along the railway line to Gospić. In the occupied territories, massacres of Croatian civilians continued, civilians were killed in Lovinac, Perušićka Kosa, Široka Kula, Urije and Lički Osik. To this day, no one has been held accountable for the crimes committed. After the fall of the Perušić barracks on 14 September, then on 18 September the barracks in Gospić, the Croatian troops had something to defend themselves with.

In late 1991, the town was the site of the Gospić massacre, where between 100-120 predominantly Serb civilians were killed by Croatian military units. Gospić Cathedral originally built in 1781 was damaged in Serb attacks and burned down on September 15, 1991. In February 1992, a statue of Nikola Tesla in downtown Gospić was destroyed in an explosion. The local Serbian Orthodox Church, originally built in 1790 and previously demolished by the Ustaše regime during World War II, was reconstructed in 1964 but again destroyed in 1992. The perpetrators were never apprehended. Control of the area finally devolved to the Croatian government with the success of Operation Storm in August 1995.

Gospić is the third smallest seat of a county government in Croatia. Its status as the county capital helped to spur some development in it, but the town as well as the entire region have suffered a constant decrease in population over the last several decades.

Gospić is also the site of one of the regional branches of the Croatian State Archives, the Državni arhiv Gospić, at Kaniška 17. It was founded 30 September 1999 and officially opened 1 September 2000 in a renovated building and now houses historical documents of relevance to the Lika-Senj region which were formerly housed in the Regional Archive at Karlovac.

In 2013, Croatian Prime Minister Zoran Milanović urged the town's authorities to allow for a replica of the Tesla statue that had been destroyed in 1992 to be reinstated. The mayor of Gospić at the time, Milan Kolić, refused to give his approval for such a move and instead vowed to erect a statue of wartime Croatian President Franjo Tuđman on the spot where the Tesla statue had once stood. In 2021, under mayor Karlo Starčević, the town renamed a square after Tesla, and the Croatian Ministry of Culture sponsored a new statue on the square, a replica of the Frano Kršinić original.

== Geography ==
Gospić is located in the mountainous and sparsely populated region of Lika. It is the administrative center of Lika-Senj County. Gospić is located near the Lika River in the middle of a karst field (Ličko Polje).

== Municipality ==
- Aleksinica, population 105 ▼
- Barlete, population 21 ▼
- Bilaj, population 143 ▼
- Brezik, population 18 ▼
- Brušane, population 126 ▼
- Budak, population 126 ▼
- Bužim, population 73 ▼
- Debelo Brdo I, population 56 ▼
- Debelo Brdo II, population 4 ▼
- Divoselo, population 1 ▼
- Donje Pazarište, population 80 ▼
- Drenovac Radučki, population 0
- Gospić, population 6362 ▼
- Kalinovača, population 99 ▼
- Kaniža Gospićka, population 354 ▼
- Klanac, population 89 ▼
- Kruščica, population 0
- Kruškovac, population 7
- Kukljić, population 10 ▼
- Lički Čitluk, population 5 ▲
- Lički Novi, population 264 ▼
- Lički Osik, population 1438 ▼
- Lički Ribnik, population 72 ▼
- Mala Plana, population 34 ▼
- Medak, population 36 ▼
- Mogorić, population 80 ▼
- Mušaluk, population 174 ▼
- Novoselo Bilajsko, population 122 ▲
- Novoselo Trnovačko, population 92 ▼
- Ornice, population 4 ▼
- Ostrvica, population 49 ▼
- Oteš, population 86 ▼
- Pavlovac Vrebački, population 38 ▲
- Počitelj, population 2 ▼
- Podastrana, population 46 ▼
- Podoštra, population 160 ▼
- Popovača Pazariška, population 77 ▼
- Rastoka, population 29 ▼
- Rizvanuša, population 18 ▼
- Smiljan, population 392 ▼
- Smiljansko Polje, population 129 ▼
- Široka Kula, population 78 ▼
- Trnovac, population 41 ▼
- Vaganac, population 25 ▼
- Velika Plana, population 40 ▼
- Veliki Žitnik, population 34 ▼
- Vranovine, population 27 ▼
- Vrebac, population 46 ▲
- Zavođe, population 1 ▼
- Žabica, population 189 ▲
Town of Gospić: Population trends 1857–2021
v

population	32381	33164	31371	34376	38103	35380	35600	35312	26920	26285	27390	26683	23285	22026	12980	12745	11502
	1857	1869	1880	1890	1900	1910	1921	1931	1948	1953	1961	1971	1981	1991	2001	2011	2021

Sources: Croatian Bureau of Statistics publications

== People ==
- Šime Starčević, Croatian priest and linguist
- Josip Filipović, Austro-Hungarian general
- Ante Starčević, Croatian politician and writer
- Ferdinand Kovačević, Croatian engineer and inventor
- Nikola Tesla, Serbian-American scientist and inventor
- Miroslav Kraljević, Croatian painter, one of the founders of modern art in Croatia
- Marko Orešković, Yugoslav Partisan and People's Hero of Yugoslavia
- Kata Pejnović, Croatian Serb feminist and politician
- Edo Kovačević, Croatian artist
- Milan Mandarić, Serbian-American businessman
- Josip Čorak, Croatian wrestler
- Jerko Rukavina, Croatian soldier
- Nikica Valentić, Croatian politician, Prime Minister of Croatia
- Darko Milinović, Croatian gynecologist and politician, Minister of Health and Social Welfare
- Nikoslav Bjegović, Serbian football player
- Dušan Dragosavac, Croatian Serb politician, President of the League of Communists of Yugoslavia
- Predrag Šuput, Serbian basketball player
- Jakov Blažević, Croatian politician, President of the Executive Council of the People's Republic of Croatia

== Gallery ==
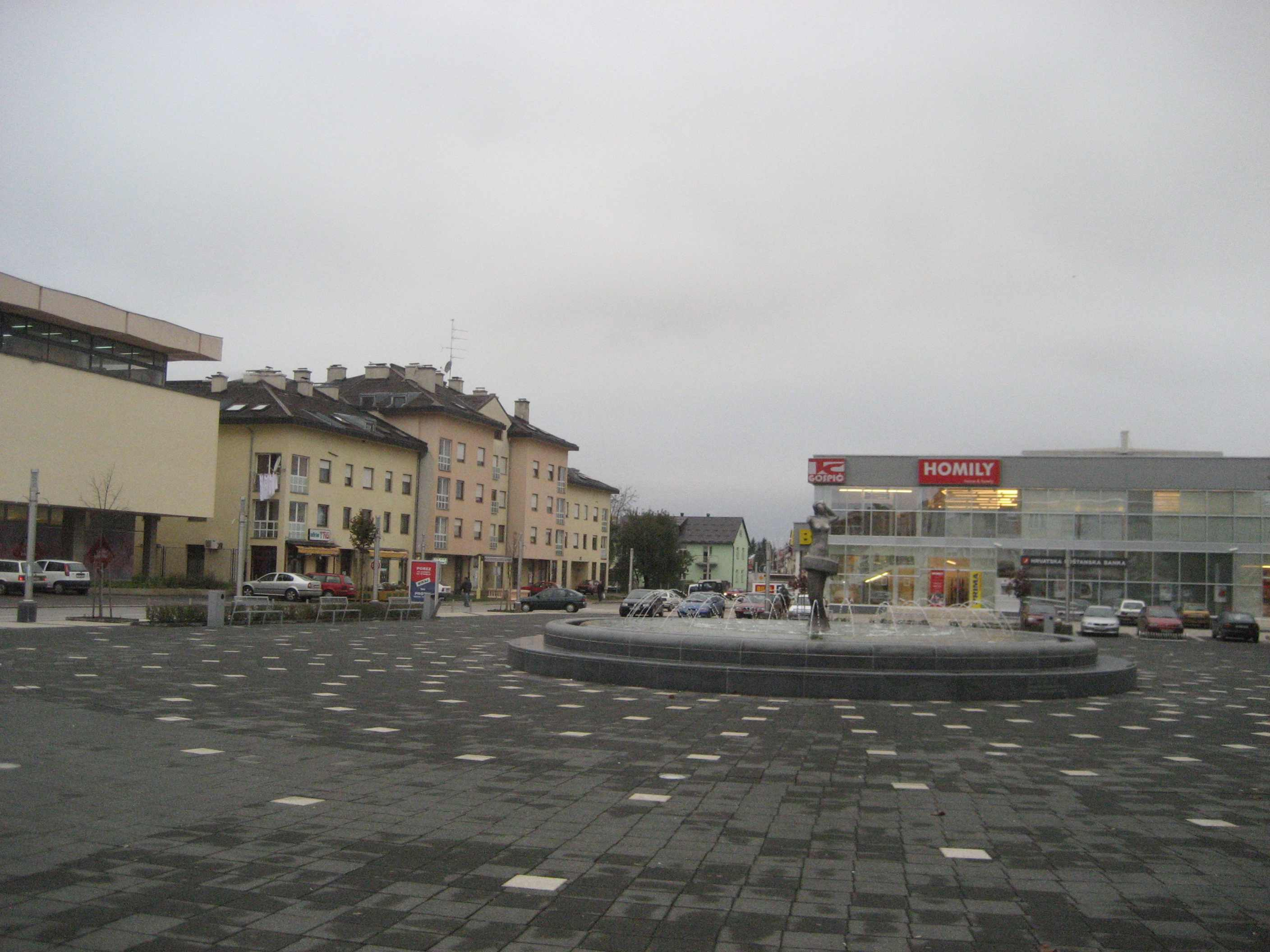
Ante Starčević Square

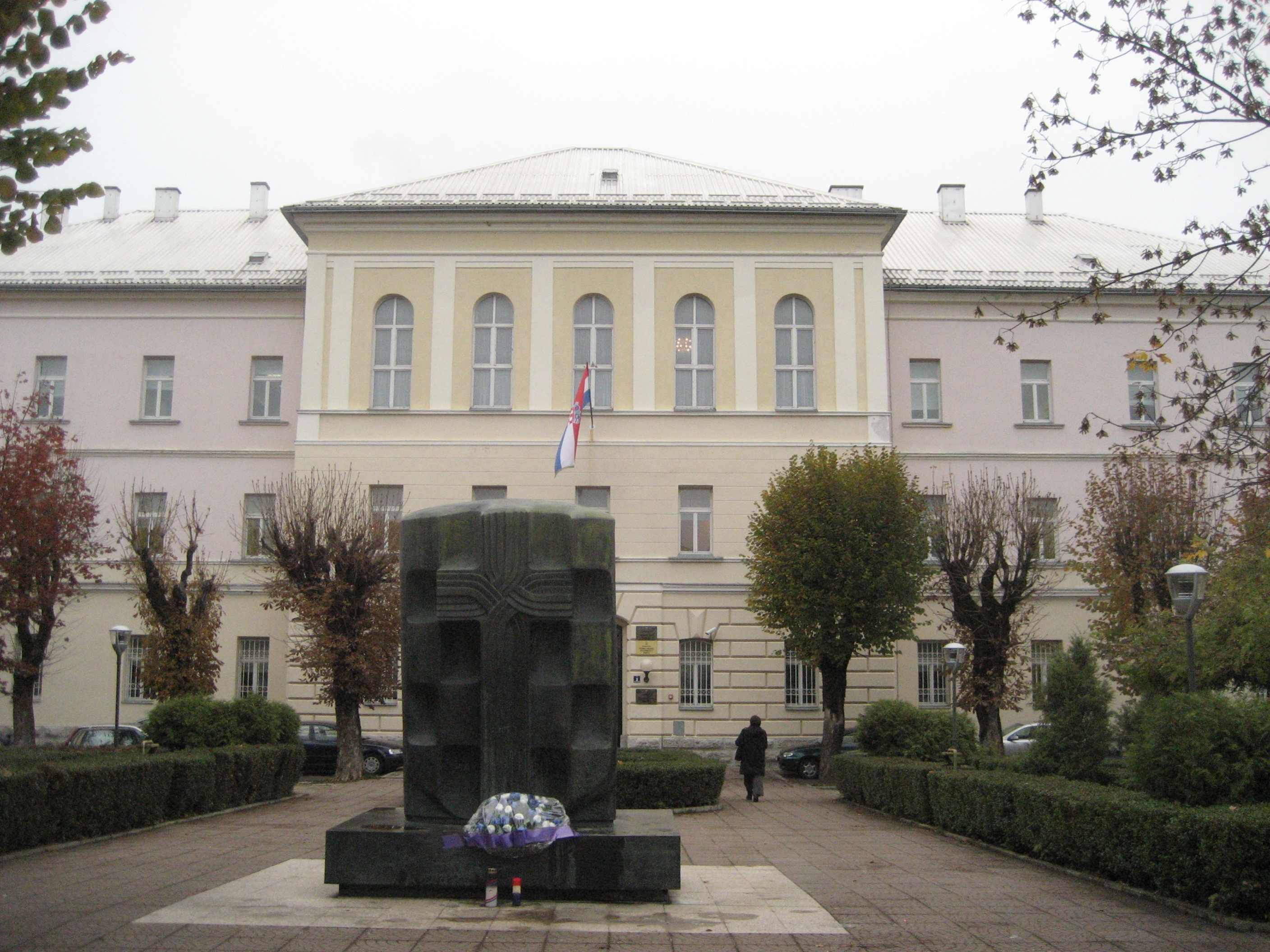
Defenders memorial

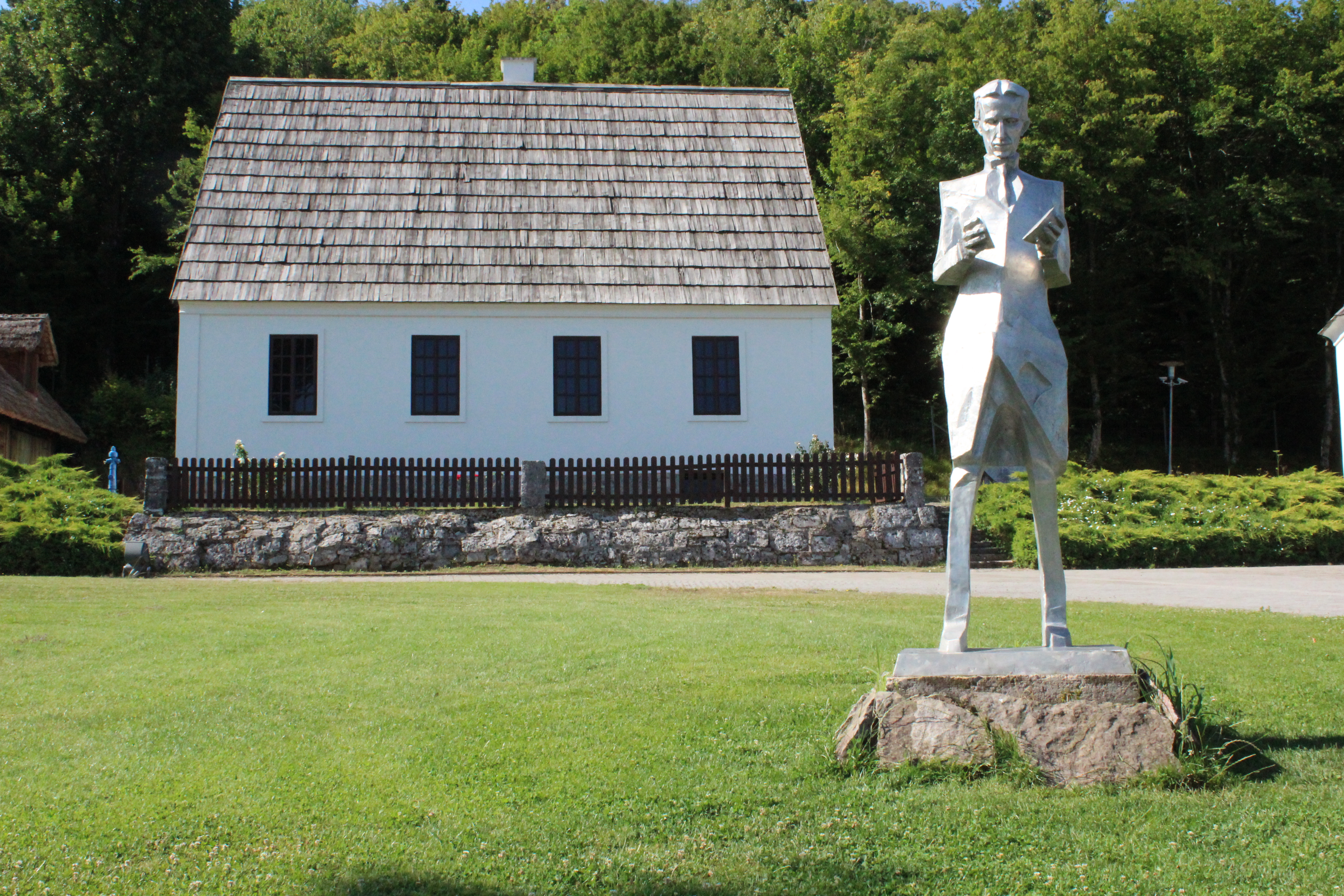
Nikola Tesla Memorial Center in the nearby village of Smiljan

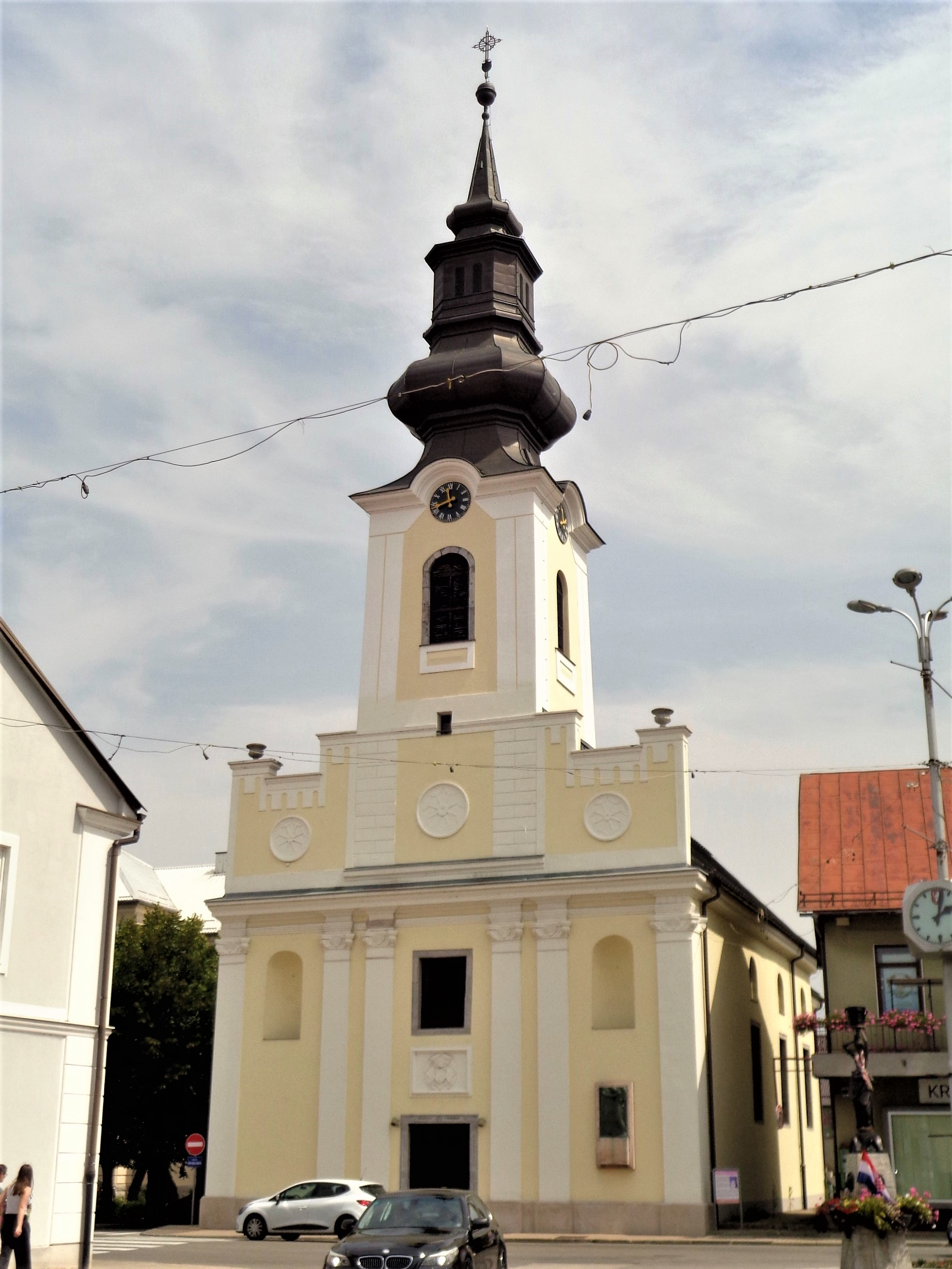
Annunciation of the Blessed Virgin Mary cathedral

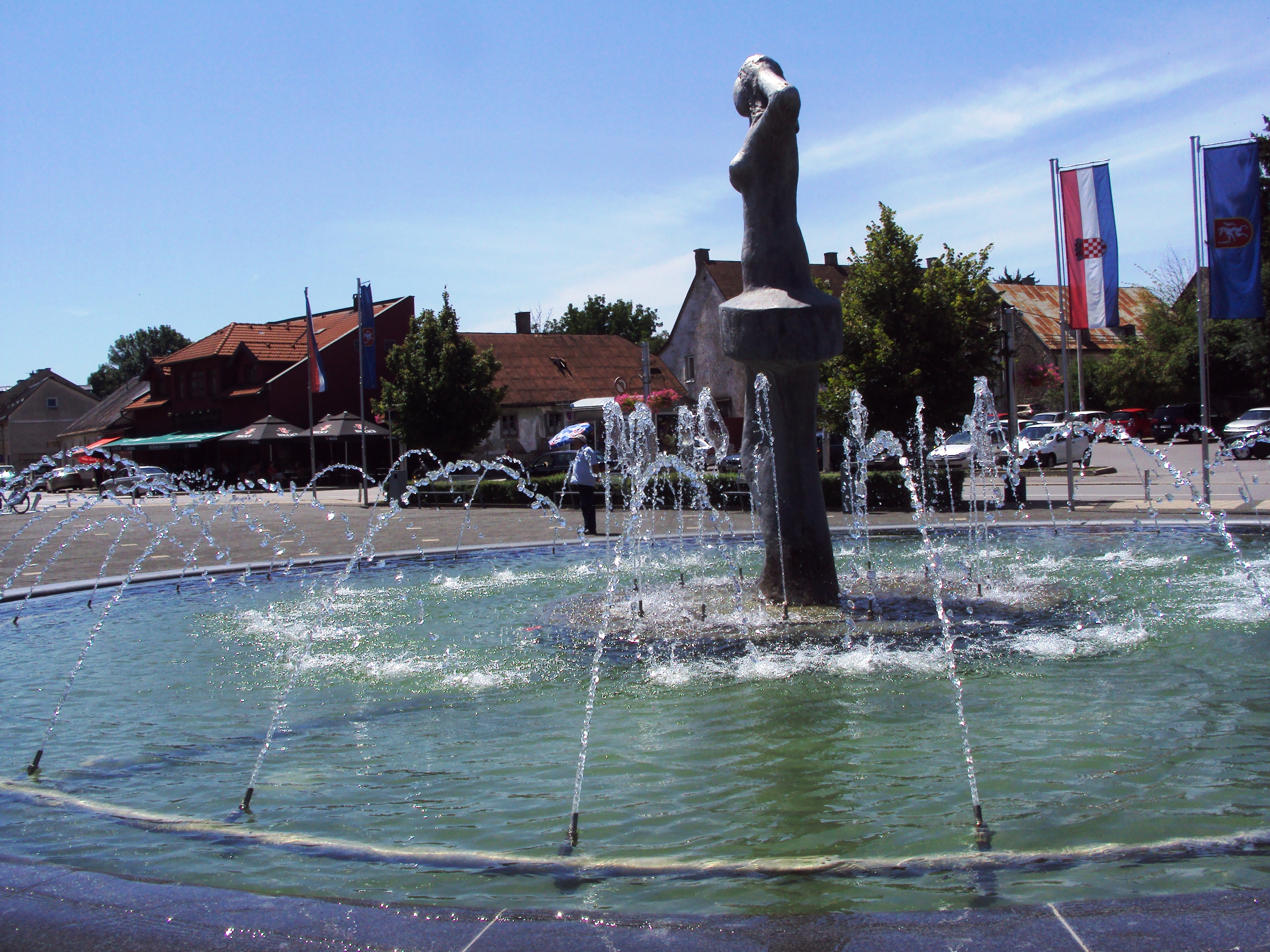
Vila Velebita Fountain

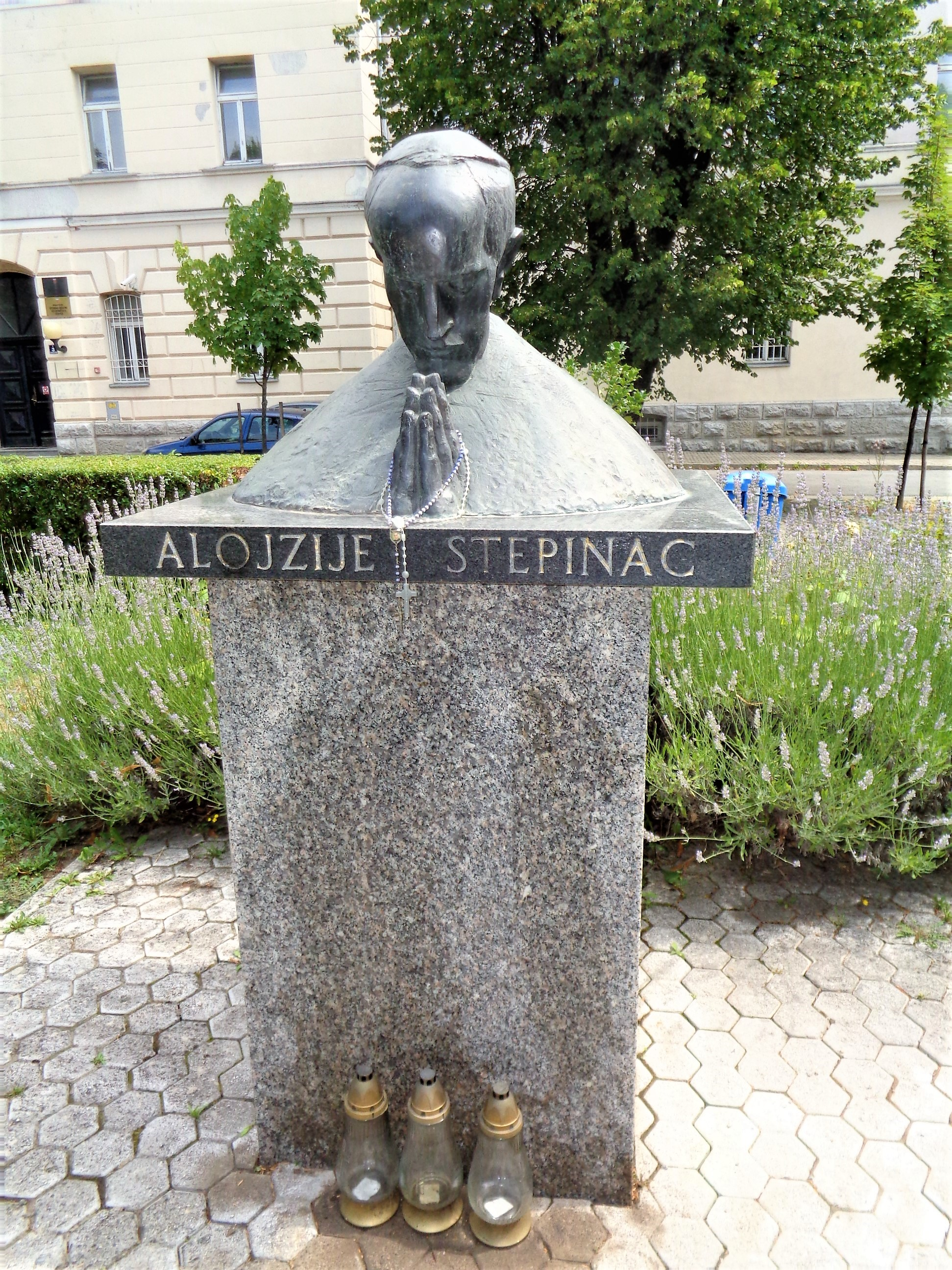
Cardinal Alojzije Stepinac bust in city park

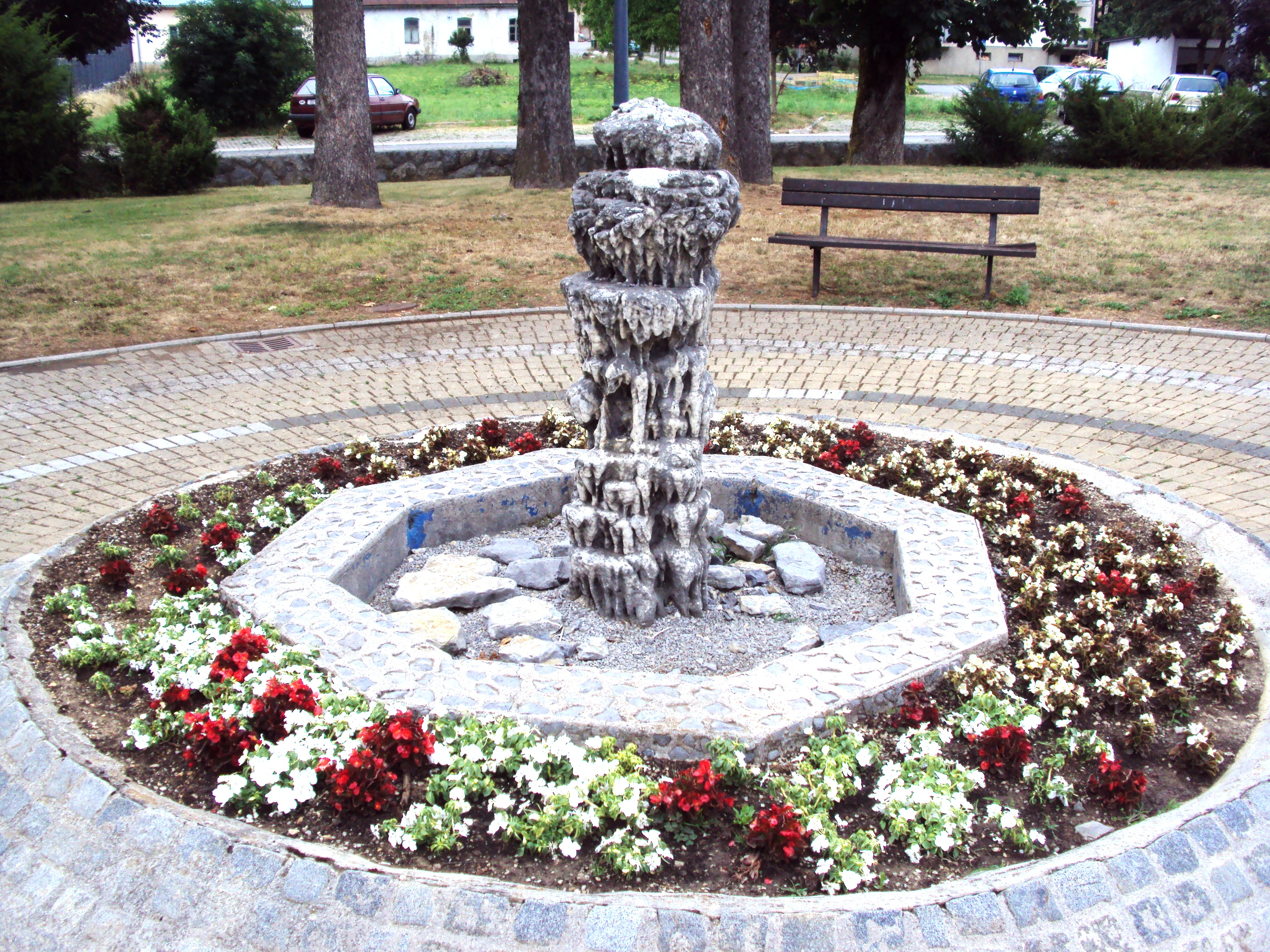
Kolakovac park

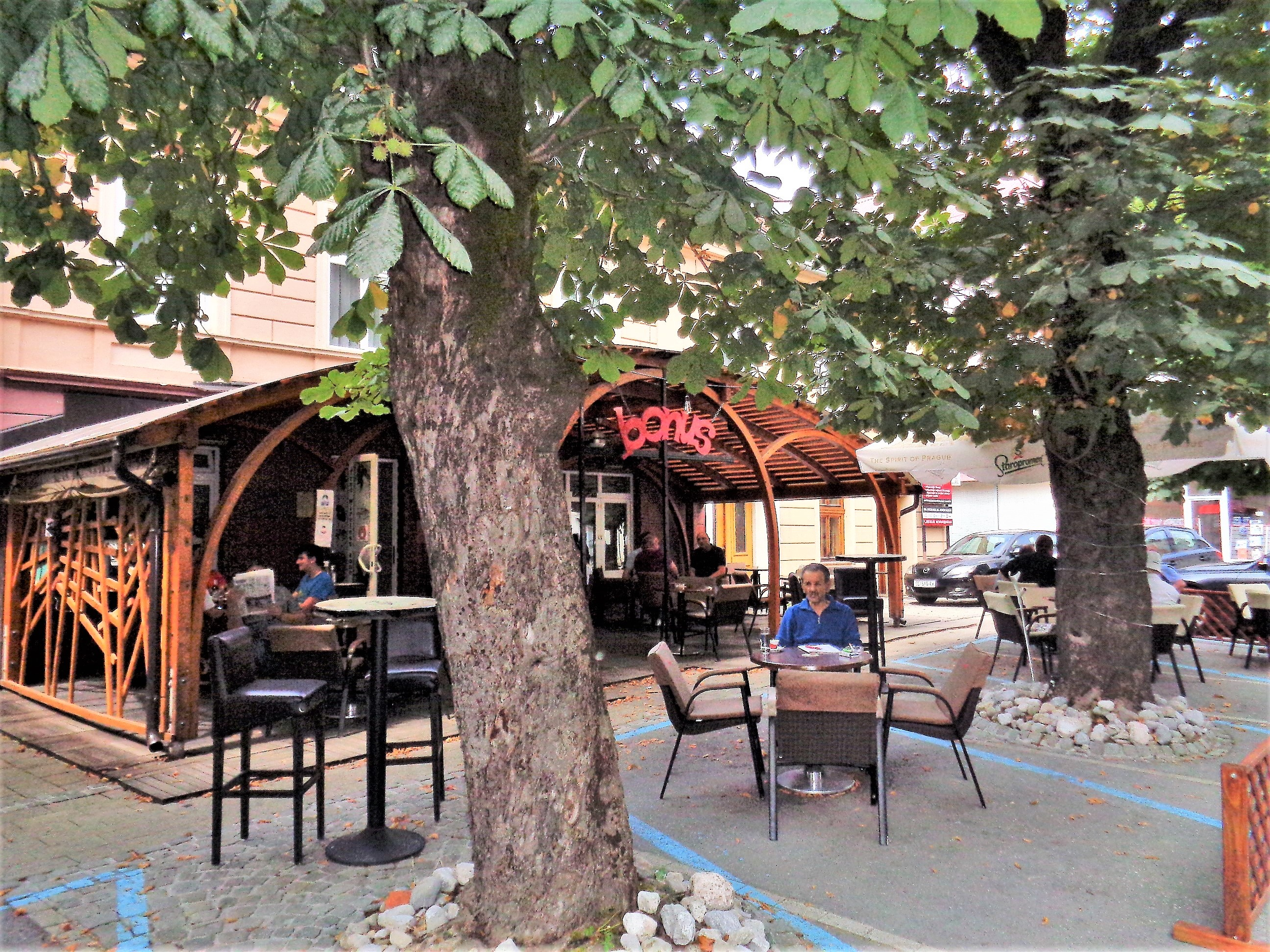
Coffeehouse in the town centre

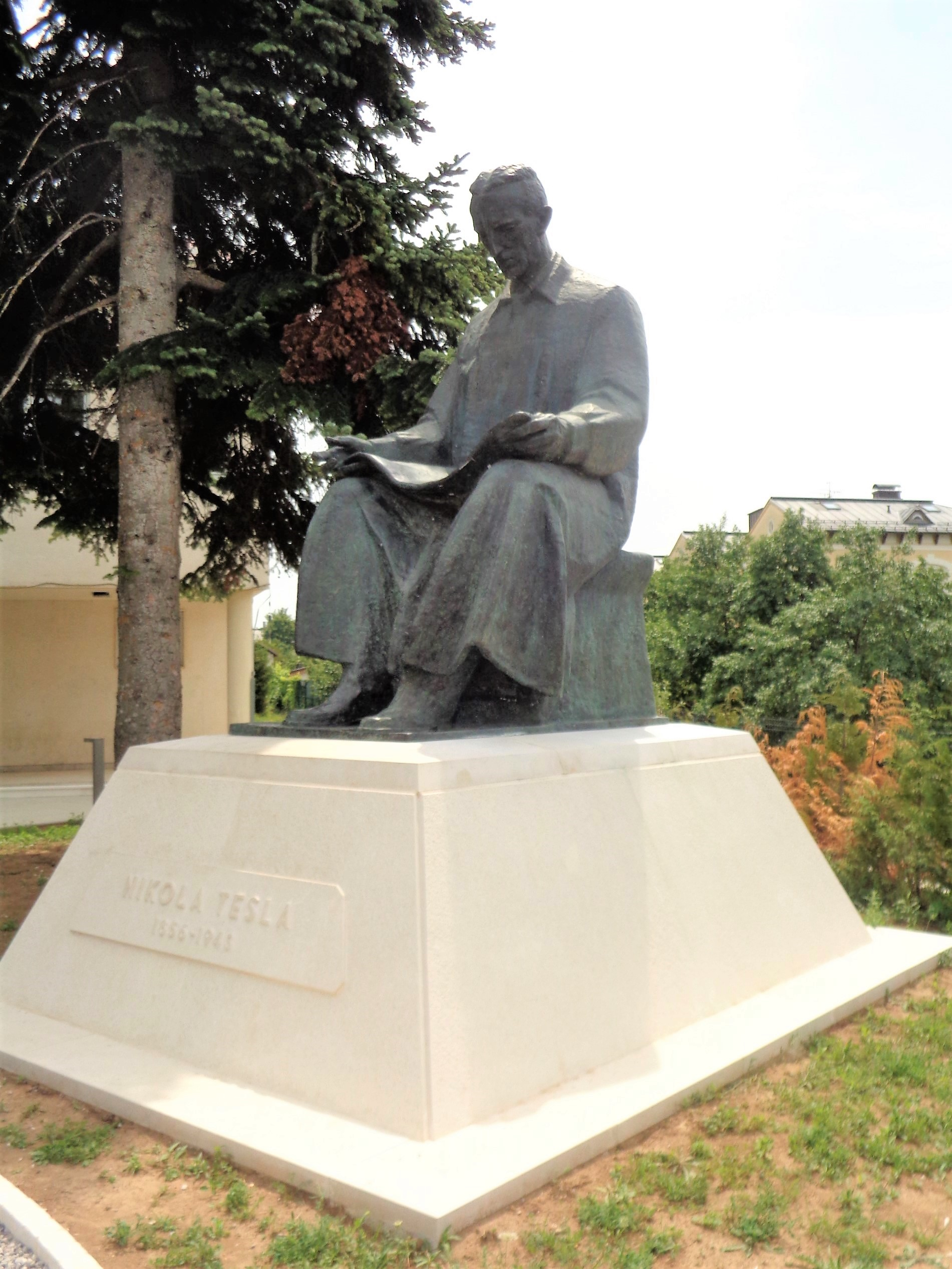
Nikola Tesla statue

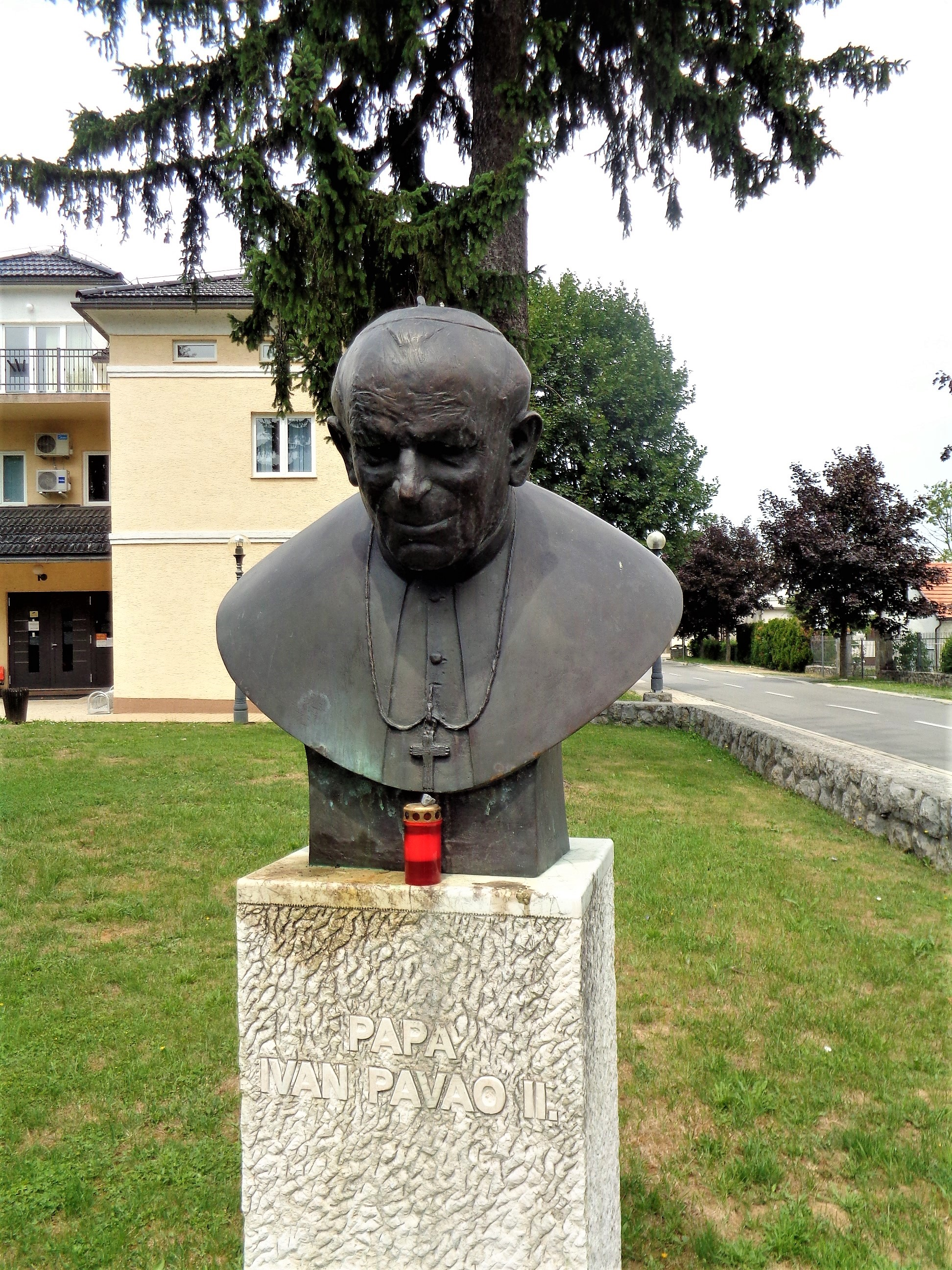
Pope John Paul II bust

== Climate ==
Gospić has a humid continental climate, Dfb by Köppen climate classification, with mean temperatures varying from −0.9 °C (30.4 °F) in January to 18.1 °C (64.6 °F) in July. Being situated higher than 500 metres (1,640 ft) above sea level, the area experiences high diurnal ranges, especially in summer, and frost has been recorded in every month except for July. The record low and high temperatures are −33.5 °C (−28.3 °F) and 38.7 °C (101.7 °F), respectively. Gospić is also quite a rainy city, with a slight summer minimum, but it experiences plentiful precipitation all year long, with the maximum being in autumn. During winter, Gospić can get strong blizzards, with on average 5.1 days a year when more than 50 cm (20 in) falls, and 16.1 days when more than 30 cm (12 in) falls. Its record snow cover was 285 cm (112.2 in), and it was measured in February 1916.

Since records began in 1872, the highest temperature recorded at the local weather station at an elevation of 564 metres (1,850 ft) was 38.7 °C (101.7 °F), on 30 July 1947. The coldest temperature was −33.5 °C (−28.3 °F), on 17 February 1956.

Climate data for Gospić (1971–2000, extremes 1872–2015)
Month	Jan	Feb	Mar	Apr	May	Jun	Jul	Aug	Sep	Oct	Nov	Dec	Year
Record high °C (°F)	16.0 (60.8)	20.1 (68.2)	23.4 (74.1)	27.9 (82.2)	31.6 (88.9)	35.4 (95.7)	38.7 (101.7)	37.2 (99.0)	33.3 (91.9)	28.8 (83.8)	25.7 (78.3)	16.9 (62.4)	38.7 (101.7)
Mean daily maximum °C (°F)	3.3 (37.9)	5.4 (41.7)	9.7 (49.5)	13.5 (56.3)	19.0 (66.2)	22.5 (72.5)	25.2 (77.4)	25.4 (77.7)	20.8 (69.4)	15.3 (59.5)	8.5 (47.3)	3.9 (39.0)	14.4 (57.9)
Daily mean °C (°F)	−0.8 (30.6)	0.3 (32.5)	4.1 (39.4)	8.0 (46.4)	13.0 (55.4)	16.3 (61.3)	18.5 (65.3)	17.9 (64.2)	13.6 (56.5)	9.1 (48.4)	3.8 (38.8)	0.0 (32.0)	8.7 (47.7)
Mean daily minimum °C (°F)	−5.0 (23.0)	−4.2 (24.4)	−1.1 (30.0)	2.5 (36.5)	6.5 (43.7)	9.4 (48.9)	10.9 (51.6)	10.5 (50.9)	7.5 (45.5)	4.1 (39.4)	−0.4 (31.3)	−3.7 (25.3)	3.1 (37.6)
Record low °C (°F)	−32.6 (−26.7)	−33.5 (−28.3)	−23.6 (−10.5)	−10.5 (13.1)	−7.0 (19.4)	−1.8 (28.8)	2.4 (36.3)	0.0 (32.0)	−5.6 (21.9)	−13.7 (7.3)	−23.2 (−9.8)	−27.0 (−16.6)	−33.5 (−28.3)
Average precipitation mm (inches)	101.8 (4.01)	98.8 (3.89)	95.2 (3.75)	108.9 (4.29)	108.4 (4.27)	95.4 (3.76)	60.4 (2.38)	83.1 (3.27)	140.4 (5.53)	156.5 (6.16)	175.4 (6.91)	141.9 (5.59)	1,365.9 (53.78)
Average precipitation days (≥ 0.1 mm)	12.7	11.6	12.4	13.8	13.2	11.9	8.3	8.2	11.2	12.4	13.8	13.5	143.0
Average snowy days (≥ 1.0 cm)	16.0	14.5	9.1	2.6	0.2	0.0	0.0	0.0	0.0	0.3	6.5	16.0	65.2
Average relative humidity (%)	84.3	79.9	74.8	72.5	72.5	72.3	70.3	73.0	78.9	81.2	84.1	86.2	77.5
Mean monthly sunshine hours	68.2	101.7	145.7	165.0	226.3	249.0	303.8	272.8	192.0	130.2	69.0	55.8	1,979.5
Percentage possible sunshine	25	38	43	44	54	59	70	67	55	42	27	21	48
Source: Croatian Meteorological and Hydrological Service

== Demographics ==
Demographic history of municipality
Ethnic group	1948	1953	1961	1971	1981	1991	2001	2011
Croats				24,307 (65.02%)	18,525 (59.25%)	18,613 (64.07%)	12,050 (92.84%)	11,860 (93.06%)
Serbs				11,801 (31.56%)	9,283 (29.69%)	8,976 (30.89%)	625 (4.82%)	609 (4.78%)
Yugoslavs				635 (1.69%)	2,907 (9.29%)	513 (1.76%)		
Others				640 (1.71%)	548 (1.75%)	947 (3.26%)	305 (2.35%)	
Total	26,920	26,285	27,390	37,383	31,263	29,049	12,980	12,745

Demographic history of town
1948	1953	1961	1971	1981	1991	2001	2011
4,204	5,127	6,767	8,046	8,725	9,025	6,088	5,795

== Politics ==
=== Minority councils and representatives ===
Directly elected minority councils and representatives are tasked with consulting tasks for the local or regional authorities in which they are advocating for minority rights and interests, integration into public life and participation in the management of local affairs. At the 2023 Croatian national minorities councils and representatives elections Serbs of Croatia fulfilled legal requirements to elect 15 members minority council of the Town of Gospić with only 13 members being elected in the end.

== Sports ==
The local chapter of the HPS is HPD "Visočica", which had 284 members in 1936 under the Ivan Gojtan presidency. At the time, it had a ski section, a caving section and a photography section. Membership rose to 291 in 1937. Membership fell to 217 in 1938. In August 1941, the Minister of Sport and Mountaineering of the NDH, Miško Zebić, named Ivan Banić as the state povjerenik of the HPD "Visočica", and designated as the chapter's advisory board: Josip Krišković, Vinko Mataija, Ivan Štimac, Antun Pichler and Juraj Vukšinić. The HPD "Visočica" was officially renamed Hrvatsko planinarsko društvo u Gospiću in March 1942, but Gospić did not reply to the order.

== See also ==
- Roman Catholic Diocese of Gospić-Senj
- Nikola Tesla Memorial Center

== Bibliography ==
=== History ===
- Matić, Zdravko (22 December 2004). "Osnivanje i rad "Napretkovih" organizacija na području Hrvatskog primorja i Gorskog kotara (1928. - 1950.)" [The Foundation and Work of "Napredak" Organisations on the Territory of Hrvatsko Primorje and Gorski Kotar]. Časopis za suvremenu povijest (in Croatian). 36 (3): 1183–1204. ISSN 1848-9079.
- Urednik (7 March 1914). "Iz ABC družtva". Jutarnji list (in Croatian). Vol. 3, no. 607. p. 5. ISSN 1334-1855.
