= Bužim, Croatia =

Bužim
- Village
- Interactive map of Bužim
- Location within Croatia
- Coordinates: 44.58428°N 15.24033°E
- Country: Croatia
- County: Lika-Senj
- Municipality: Gospić

Area
  - Total: 15.16 sq mi (39.26 km^{2})

Population (2021)
  - Total: 73
  - Density: 4.8/sq mi (1.9/km^{2})
- Time zone: UTC+1 (CET)
  - Summer (DST): UTC+2 (CEST)

Bužim is a village in the City of Gospić, Croatia. It is connected by the D25 road.
