= D50 road =

Road in Croatia

D50 state road

Route information
- Length: 104.2 km (64.7 mi)

Major junctions
- From: D23 near Žuta Lokva
- D25 in Lički Osik and Gospić; D534 in Budak; A1 in Otočac and Sveti Rok interchanges
- To: D27 in Gračac

Location
- Country: Croatia
- Counties: Lika-Senj, Zadar
- Major cities: Otočac, Gospić, Gračac

Highway system
- Highways in Croatia

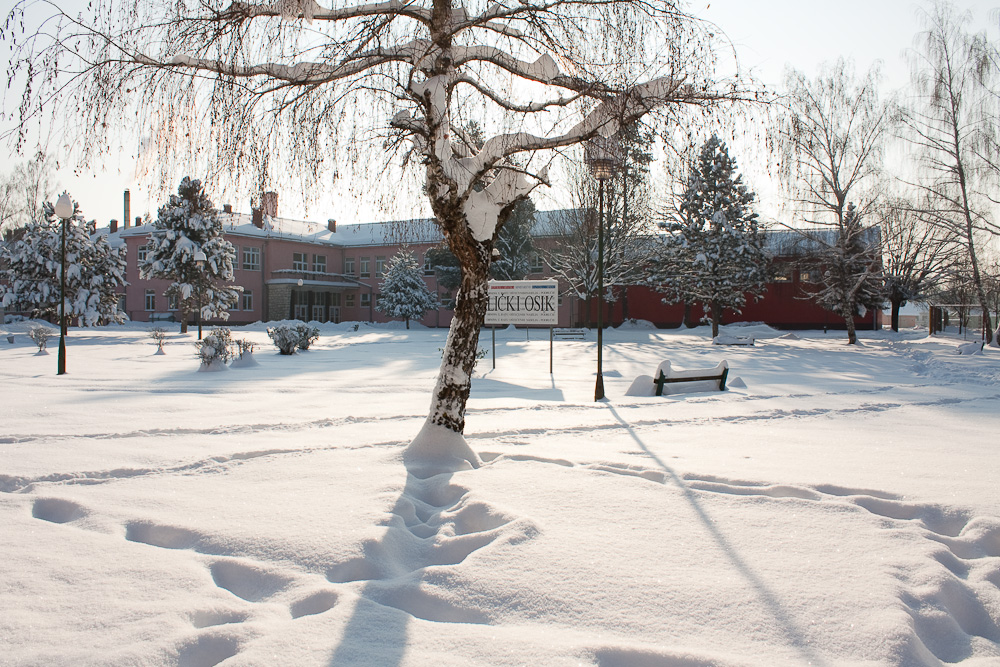
Lički Osik, on the D50 route

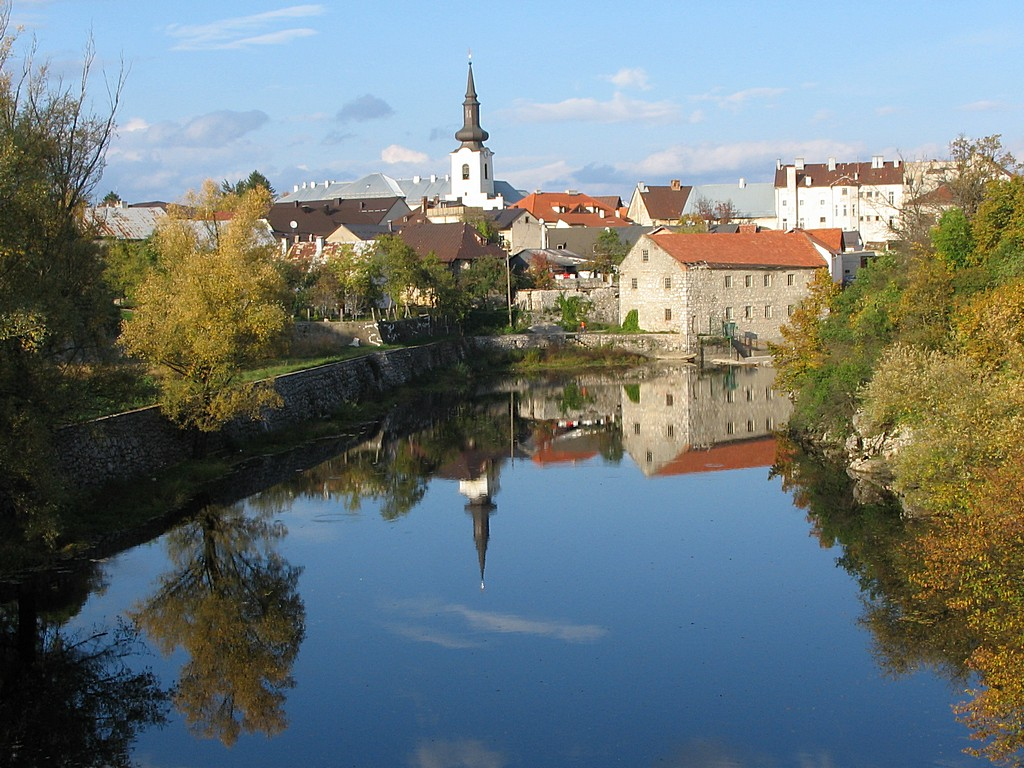
Gospić, on the D50 route

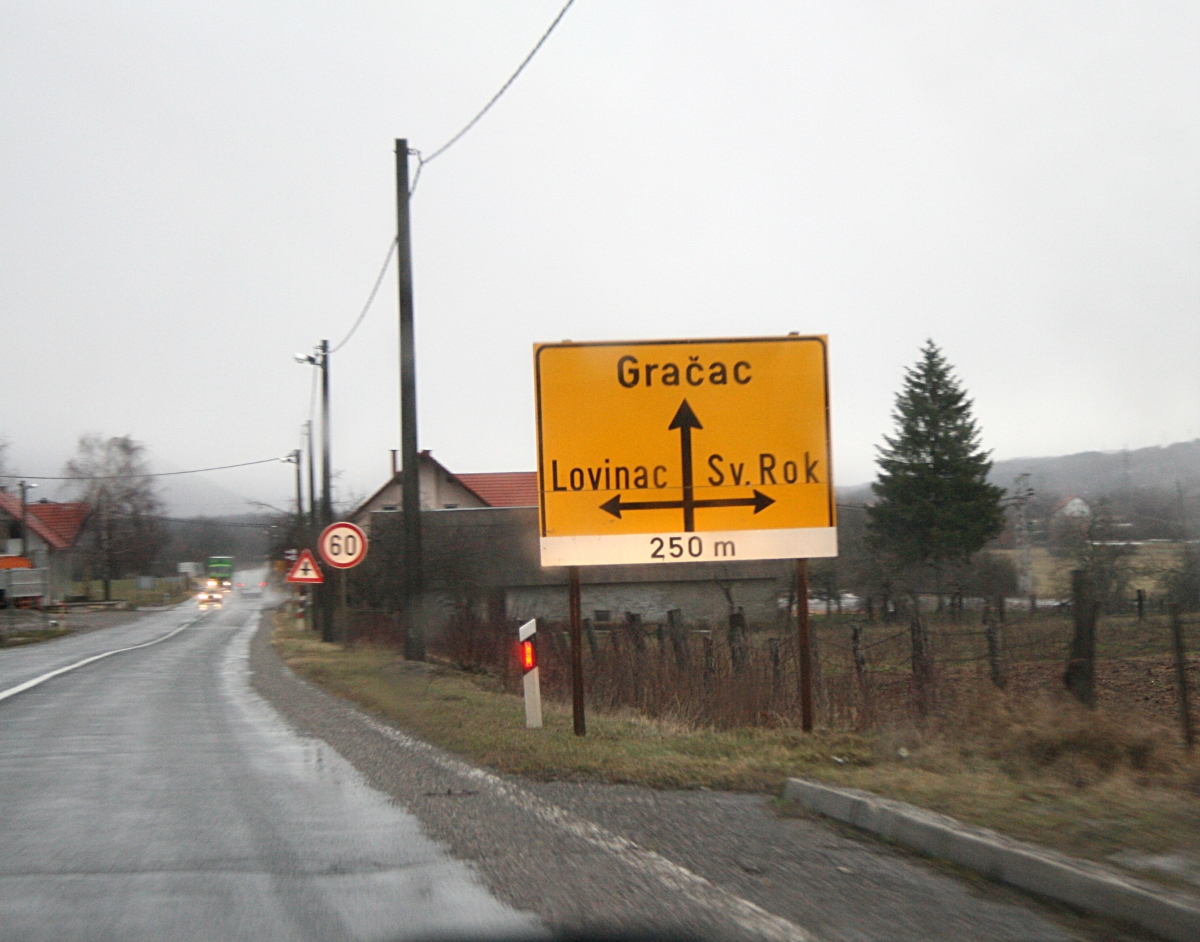
Approach to intersection of D50 and Ž5165/D547 roads

D50 state road, located mainly in Lika region of Croatia connecting cities and towns of Otočac, Gospić, Perušić and Gračac, to the state road network of Croatia, and most notably to A1 motorway at a number of interchanges - Otočac and Sveti Rok interchanges (directly) and Gospić and Gornja Ploča interchanges (via D534 and D522 state roads respectively). The road is 104.2 km (64.7 mi) long. The route comprises a significant number of urban intersections, in segment of the road running through Gospić.

The D50 state road runs parallel to a section of the A1 motorway between Žuta Lokva and Sveti Rok interchanges, thus serving as an alternate or backup route for the motorway.

The road, as well as all other state roads in Croatia, is managed and maintained by Hrvatske ceste, a state-owned company.

== Traffic volume ==
Traffic is regularly counted and reported by Hrvatske ceste, operator of the road. Substantial variations between annual (AADT) and summer (ASDT) traffic volumes at some counting sites are attributed to the fact that the road connects to D23 and D27 which in turn provide connections to the Adriatic coast resorts and other major highways.

D50 traffic volume
Road	Counting site	AADT	ASDT	Notes
D50	4202 Brlog	1,368	2,823	Adjacent to Ž5127 junction.
D50	4203 Otočac (Brlog)	2,800	4,150	Adjacent to Ž5140 junction. Estimate by HC.
D50	4205 Ličko Lešće	1,717	1,951	Adjacent to Ž5147 junction.
D50	4905 Sveti Rok	1,412	1,481	Near Sveti Rok.
D50	4906 Ličko Cerje	1,135	1,640	The southernmost traffic counting site on the D50 road.

== Road junctions and populated areas ==
D50 major junctions/populated areas
Type	Slip roads/Notes
	D23 to Senj (to the west) and Josipdol (to the east). The intersection is located approximately 300 to the south of A1 motorway Žuta Lokva interchange connector road (via D23). Northbound D50 traffic defaults to the westbound D23, and conversely, eastbound D23 traffic defaults to the southbound D50. The northern terminus of the road.
	Ž5127 to Hrvatsko Polje.
	A1 in Otočac interchange, to Zagreb (to the north) and to Zadar and Split (to the south).
	Otočac; Ž5128 to Glavace and Dabar. Ž5140 to Švica and Krasno Polje. Ž5143 to Prozor.
	D52 to Korenica
	Čovići; Ž5144 to Podhum.
	Ž5146 to Studenci and Donji Kosinj.
	Ličko Lešće; Ž5147 to Vrelo Gacke.
	Ž5148 to Ramljani.
	Kvarte
	Perušić; Ž5154 to Klanac. Ž5155 to Kosa Janjačka.
	Lički Osik; D25 to Bunić and Korenica (to the east). The westbound D25 and the southbound D50 are concurrent between Lički Osik and Gospić.
	Ž5171 to Mušaluk.
	Budak; D534 to A1 motorway in Gospić interchange.
	Gospić; D25 to Karlobag (to the west). The eastbound D25 and the northbound D50 are concurrent between Lički Osik and Gospić. Ž5163 to Lički Novi.
	Novoselo Bilajsko; Ž5164 to Vrebac and Podlopača.
	Medak
	A1 in Sveti Rok interchange, to Zagreb (to the north) and to Zadar and Split (to the south).
	D547 to Sveti Rok and Obrovac. Ž5165 to Lovinac and Gornja Ploča.
	Ričice
	Štikada
	Gračac; D27 to Obrovac, Benkovac and A1 motorway Benkovac interchange (to the south), and to Korenica and Knin via D1 state road (to the north). Junction of D27 and D1 is located approximately 2 km (1.2 mi) to the north, in Gračac. D27 may be used as a bypass of both motorway Maslenica bridge and Adriatic Highway Maslenica Bridge for traffic between Zadar and Sveti Rok. The southern terminus of the road.
