= Battle of Gospić =

Battle of the Croatian War of Independence

Coordinates: 44.5468°N 15.3721°E

- Part of the Croatian War of Independence
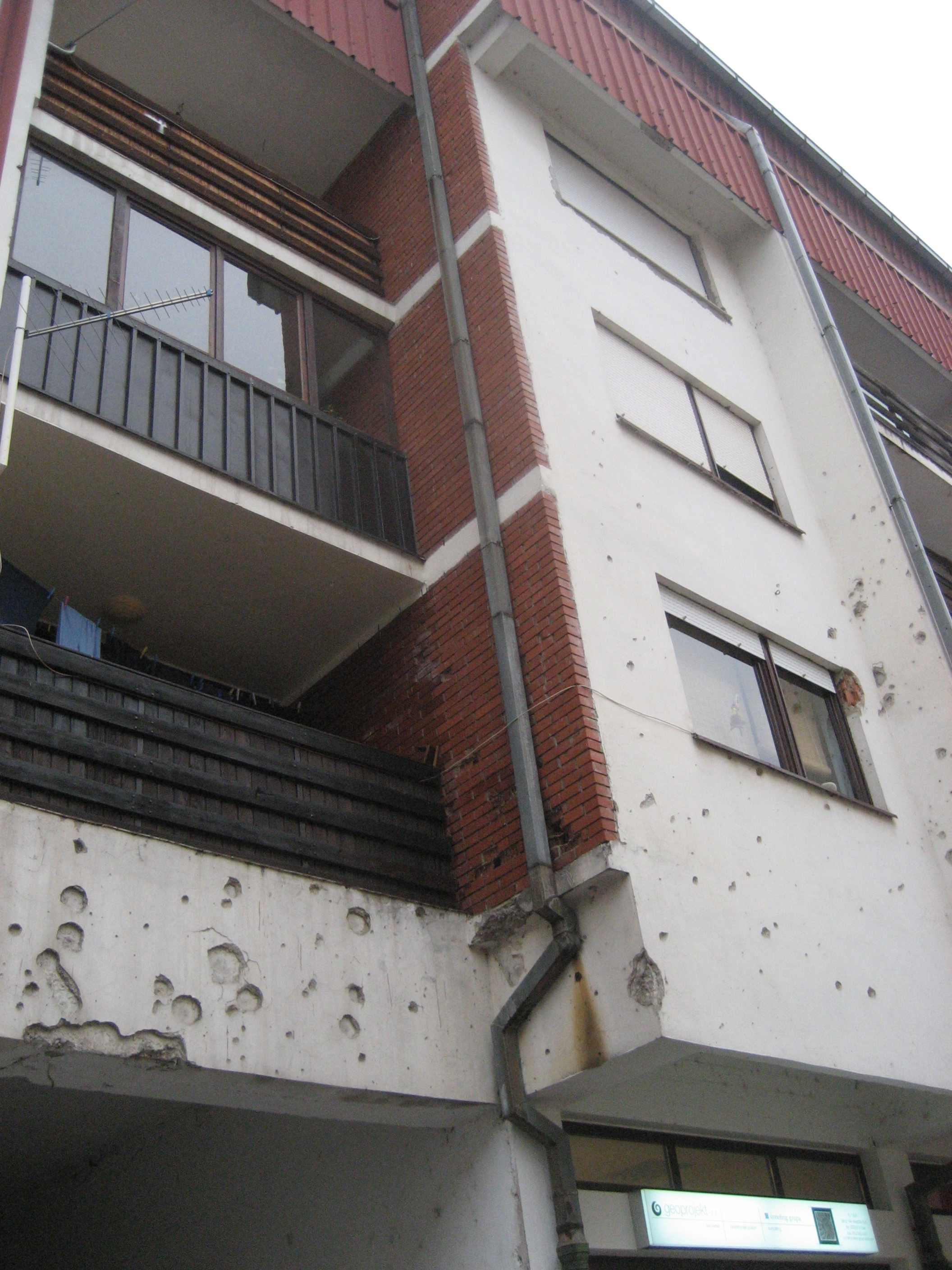
- Building in Gospić, damaged during the battle
Date	29 August – 22 September 1991 (3 weeks and 3 days)
Location	Gospić, Croatia
Result	Croatian victory

Belligerents
(Socialist Federal Republic of Yugoslavia) Yugoslavia; SAO Krajina	Croatia

Commanders and leaders
(Socialist Federal Republic of Yugoslavia) Relja Tomić; Đorđe Božović †	(Croatia) Mirko Norac (Croatia) Ivan Dasović

Units involved
Yugoslav People's Army; Yugoslav Ground Forces; 35th Partisan Division; 1st Brigade; 236th Motorized Brigade; Serbian Guard	Croatian National Guard: 118th Infantry Brigade; Croatian Police; Croatian Defence Forces

Strength
400	427

Casualties and losses
Unknown fatalities 300 captured	Unknown

The Battle of Gospić (Serbian: Битка за Госпић, Croatian: Bitka za Gospić) was fought in the environs of Gospić, Croatia, from 29 August until 22 September 1991 during the Croatian War of Independence. The battle pitted the Yugoslav People's Army (JNA), stationed in five barracks in the town, and paramilitary elements of the Serbian Guard against the Croatian National Guard (ZNG), police forces based in Gospić and police reinforcements from elsewhere in Croatia. Fighting in the eastern districts of Gospić, controlled by JNA forces with supporting artillery, was largely static but the balance shifted in favor of the Croatian forces following the capture of several JNA depots and barracks on 14 September. The remaining barracks were captured by 20 September leading to the expulsion of the JNA and Serbian Guard forces from the town.

The battle followed escalating ethnic tensions in the Lika region, including attacks on Croatian civilians in Lovinac, an attack on a Croatian police checkpoint in Žuta Lokva, and skirmishes at the Plitvice Lakes and the Ljubovo Pass on the Gospić–Plitvička Jezera road. The remainder of 1991 saw further deterioration of the situation in the region, resulting in war crimes against Serbs and Croats in the Gospić and Široka Kula massacres. Fighting in the region remained deadlocked, with little to no territorial gains to either side, until a lasting ceasefire was called with the signing of the Sarajevo Agreement of 2 January 1992.

== Background ==
In August 1990, an insurrection took place in Croatia centred on the predominantly Serb-populated areas of the Dalmatian hinterland around the city of Knin, as well as in parts of the Lika, Kordun, and Banovina regions, and settlements in eastern Croatia with significant Serb populations. These regions became the newly formed SAO Krajina (Serb Autonomous Oblast). The announcement of SAO Krajina's intent to integrate with Serbia resulted in the government of Croatia declaring the insurrection a rebellion.

By March 1991, the conflict had escalated into the Croatian War of Independence and in June 1991, with the Breakup of Yugoslavia, Croatia declared its independence. The declaration came into effect on 8 October after a three-month moratorium. The SAO Krajina, renamed Republic of Serbian Krajina (RSK) on 19 December, then initiated a campaign of ethnic cleansing against Croatian civilians.

Control of the growing tensions became hampered by increasing support of SAO Krajina being provided by the Yugoslav People's Army (JNA). The inability of the Croatian Police to cope with the situation led to the establishment of the Croatian National Guard (ZNG) in May 1991. However, the development of the ZNG into a military force was hampered by a UN arms embargo, introduced in September, while the military conflict in Croatia continued to escalate—the Battle of Vukovar started on 26 August.

== Prelude ==
Gospić on the map of Croatia. RSK and Yugoslav Army-held area near Dubrovnik in early 1992 are highlighted red.

An already tense situation in the Lika region, following 1 April Plitvice Lakes incident when the first fatalities of the Croatian War of Independence occurred, deteriorated further in June when Croatia reaffirmed its sovereignty through a parliamentary declaration. This was reflected in the rise of violent incidents, setting up of unauthorized road checkpoints and occasional exchanges of small arms fire. On 22 June, three policemen were abducted on the road between Gospić and SAO Krajina-controlled Gračac, and a series of attacks on the Croatian police occurred in various parts of Lika, including Gospić, on 27–28 June. In July 1991, the JNA started to openly confront the Croatian police and the ZNG in Lika. On 1 July, Plitvice police station was surrounded by the JNA, and on 6 July, two ZNG troops were killed and another two wounded in a JNA ambush near Gospić. Further escalation of the fighting was seen at the Ljubovo pass on the Gospić–Korenica road, where the JNA and SAO Krajina troops fought and pushed the ZNG back on 28–29 July.

Ethnic violence continued to escalate when Serb paramilitaries abducted and killed five Croatian civilians from Lovinac in southern Lika on 5 August, and a police checkpoint in Žuta Lokva was attacked. In early August, the JNA moved the 236th Proletarian Motorized Brigade (a brigade in name only, the 236th was actually only a company-sized unit) and a portion of the motorised battalion of the 4th Armoured Brigade, previously deployed to the Ljubovo pass, to Gospić as reinforcements for its garrison in the town. Other movements in that month include the assault and capture of the Plitvice police station on the 30th by SAO Krajina forces.

With the imminent capture of Plitvice and the withdrawal of the ZNG from Lički Osik on 31 August, 8 kilometres (5.0 miles) north of Gospić, the SAO Krajina and the JNA shifted their focus in Lika to Gospić itself, where Serbs comprised 38.4% of the total population of 12,000.

== Order of battle ==
The JNA forces consisted of 70 officers and 200 soldiers garrisoned at the Stanko Opsenica barracks and four other smaller JNA facilities in Gospić. The garrison was supported by 128 Serbian Guard paramilitaries led by Đorđe Božović, which deployed to Gospić from Serbia using JNA transportation, according to an interview with the commanding officer of the southern Lika Territorial Defence in 1991. Following a reorganization in 1991, the JNA units based in Gospić were the 236th Motorized Brigade and the 1st Brigade of the 35th Partisan Division, both subordinated to the Rijeka Corps. Prior to this, the 10th Proletarian Infantry Regiment, a B-class unit required to maintain only 15% of wartime troop levels, was stationed in Gospić, but was amalgamated with the 9th Proletarian Infantry Regiment to form the 236th Motorized Brigade. The JNA garrison in Gospić was formally commanded by Colonel Petar Ćavar, however effective command was taken over by his chief of staff, Yugoslav Counterintelligence Service Major Relja Tomić.

In early September, Croatian forces in Gospić comprised 427 troops, largely drawn from police forces based in Gospić, Rijeka and Zabok, volunteers from Gospić, Zagreb and Senj as well as Croatian Defence Forces troops. The only ZNG unit in Gospić was the 118th Infantry Brigade, which started to form around the ZNG 58th Independent Battalion on 14 August, but would not be fully assembled until after October. By mid-September, the brigade comprised two battalions—one with four companies and the other one three. The 118th Infantry Brigade was commanded by Lieutenant Colonel Mirko Norac, while the head of the Croatian police in Gospić was Ivan Dasović.

== Timeline ==
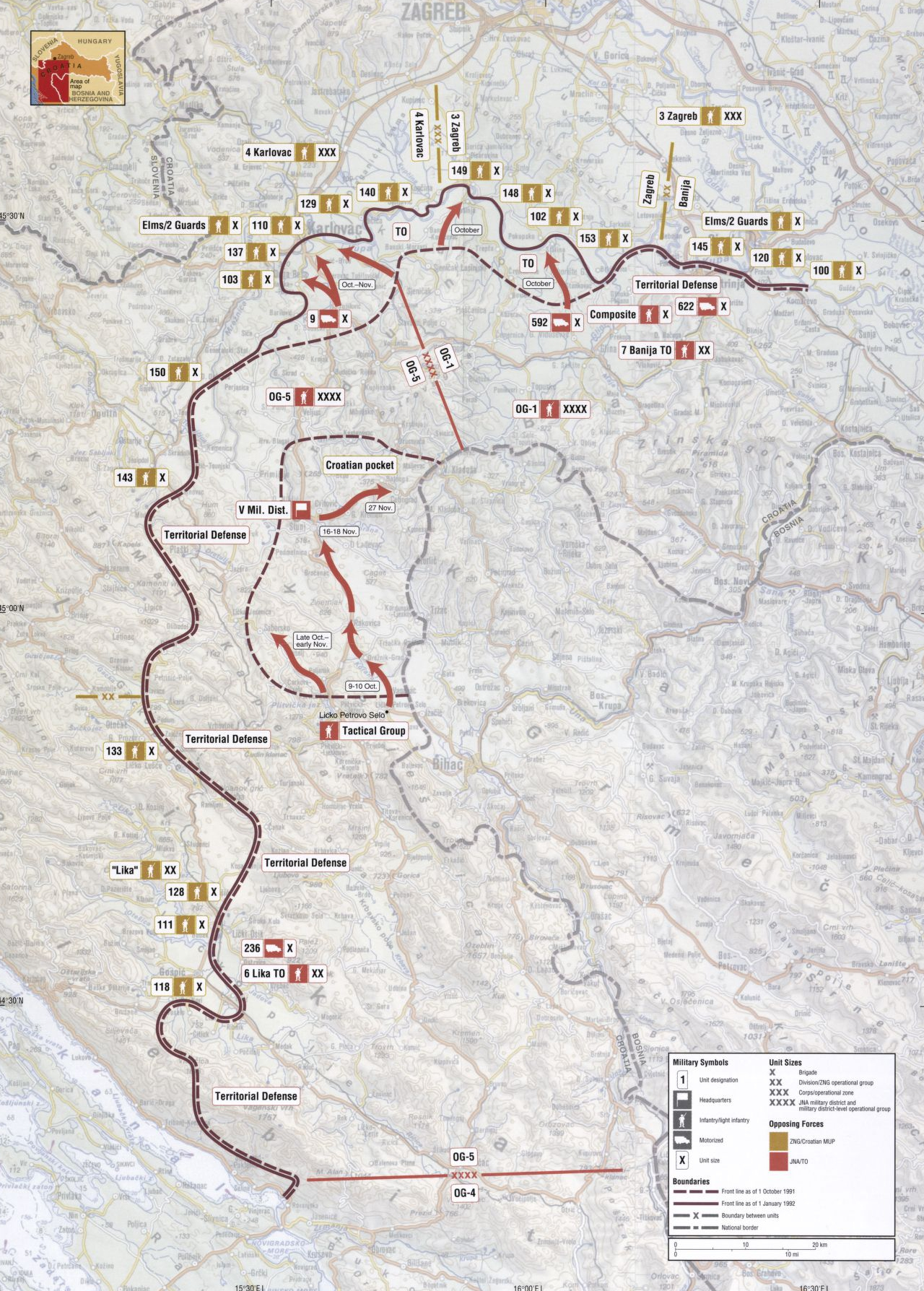
Front lines in Croatia in October–December 1991; the Battle of Gospić reflected itself in formation of a salient south of Gospić

The JNA and the Serb paramilitary force bombarded Gospić with artillery stationed in the village of Divoselo and JNA Jasikovac Barracks on 29 August 1991. The intensity of these attacks increased significantly towards mid-September causing significant damage to Gospić; one SAO Krajina report of the attack estimated that more than 50% of structures in the city were damaged.

At the outset of the battle, the JNA and the paramilitaries pushed the Croatian force out of eastern Gospić. On 5 September, Croatian forces captured JNA Major General Trajče Krstevski, along with three armoured personnel carriers (APCs) and 32 soldiers, when he attempted to reach JNA barracks that were isolated in the centre of the town but released them the next day following the successful negotiation of a prisoner exchange (POWs). The Croatian commanders in Gospić, however, declined a request that the APCs also be returned—contrary to the instructions of Croatian authorities in Zagreb. Following the capture of Krstevski, the JNA artillery bombardment intensified, averaging 1,100 artillery shells per day. Despite the intense bombardment, the second week of the battle was a stalemate, without any changes in lines of control.

The ZNG and Croatian police planned to cut power, water and communications to all JNA facilities in the government-controlled part of Croatia on 14 September. In Gospić, this action was brought forward to 13 September, the same day that the ZNG captured a JNA storage facility. This provided the Croatian troops with 14,000 rifles and a substantial quantity of antitank weapons, more than sufficient for the Croatian forces to match the JNA in the town. The JNA barracks in Perušić and Kaniža Barracks in Gospić were captured the following day. The bulk of the JNA garrison in Gospić surrendered on 18 September, following three days of fighting for the Stanko Opsenica Barracks. An infantry attack aiming to support the JNA garrison was successfully repelled by Croatian forces on 16 September in the Divoselo area, where Božović was killed. After the city centre became relatively secure, the Croatian forces extended their offensive, capturing the Jasikovac Barracks and relieving two Croatian-held pockets in villages of Ribnik and Bilaj by 20 September. As the JNA surrendered, the Serb forces retreated from the eastern parts of Gospić to a line 8 kilometres (5.0 miles) in front of Medak, as the Croatian forces completed mopping up in Gospić by 22 September.

== Aftermath ==
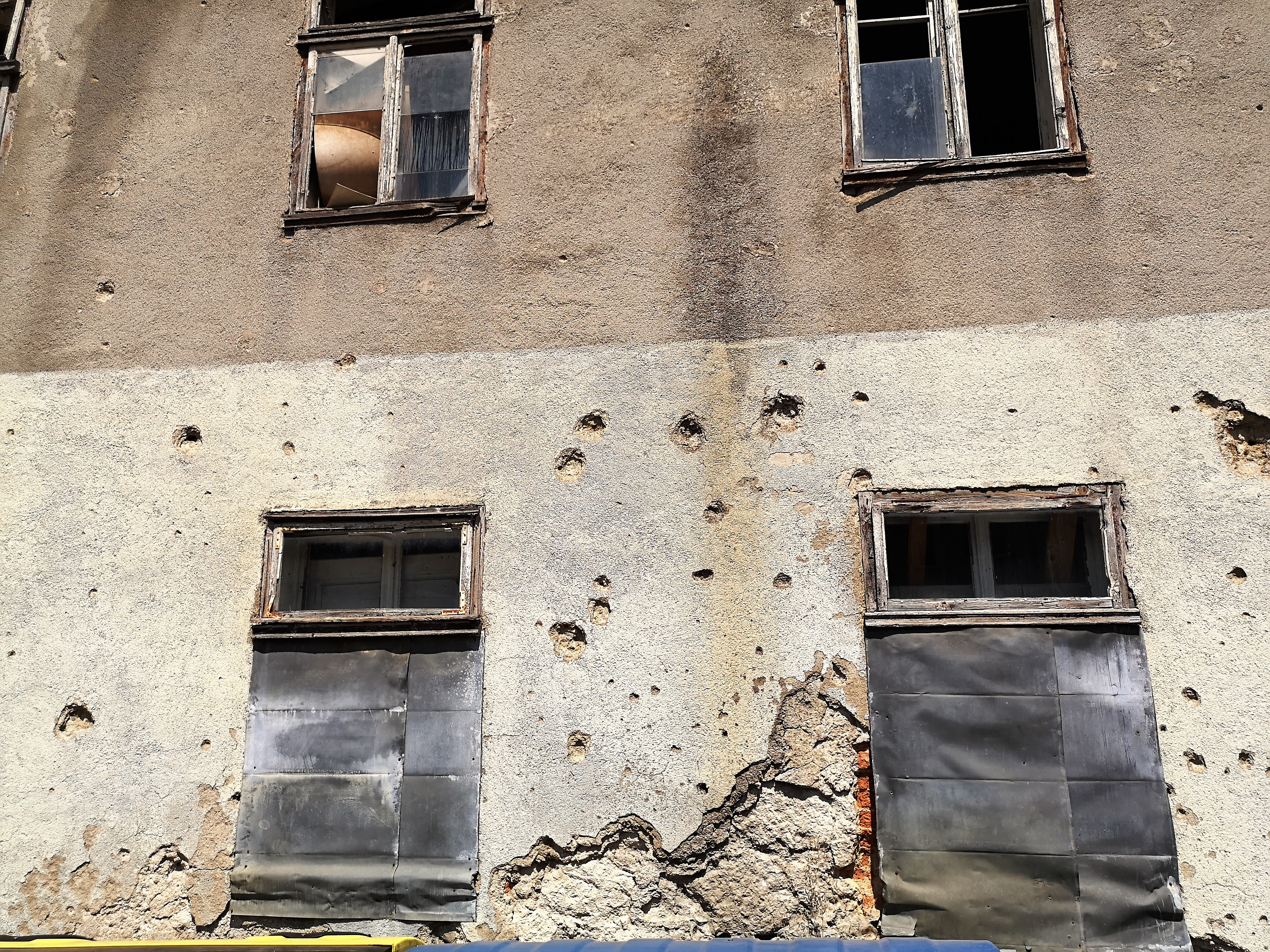
Damages can still be seen in 2021

Croatia captured approximately 300 JNA officers and soldiers, who were taken to Rijeka after their capture. They were later exchanged for Croatian POWs captured by the JNA in the Battle of Vukovar and elsewhere in Croatia. A large quantity of small arms and ammunition was captured as well as seven tanks and twelve 120-millimetre (4.7 in) mortars. After the battle, the artillery bombardment of Gospić continued from positions around Divoselo and Lički Čitluk, approximately 5 to 8 kilometres (3.1 to 5.0 miles) south of Gospić. Skirmishes in Lika continued until January 1992 as each side sought to improve their positions on the ground, especially around Gospić and Otočac. On 23 September, a Croatian advance to the south was stopped by JNA and SAO Krajina forces, consisting of an infantry battalion and the Krajina Express armored train, which were defending a JNA storage depot in Sveti Rok. The JNA secured the depot and captured Lovinac on 26 September. By the end of September, Croatian defensive positions around Otočac were sufficiently reinforced that only minor attacks were launched and primarily near the village of Drenov Klanac. In late October and early December, fighting intensified around Divoselo near Gospić, but no territory changed hands. The intensity of artillery bombardment of Gospić peaked on 1 November 1991, when 3,500 artillery shells struck the town. In December, the JNA Knin Corps proposed to the JNA General Staff to advance from Gračac in an attempt to capture Gospić and Otočac, but the signing of the Sarajevo Agreement and ceasefire of 2 January 1992 largely halted further fighting, until the commencement of Operation Medak Pocket in September 1993.

The continuing military confrontation in the region was accompanied by an escalation of ethnic violence, culminating in war crimes against civilians committed by military authorities in Gospić and the SAO Krajina military in the area around Lički Osik in October 1991. In Gospić, approximately 100 Serb civilians were taken from the town and killed in the surrounding fields. Some of the responsibles for the event, later known as the Gospić massacre, were prosecuted by the Croatian judiciary. This resulted in the conviction, in 2003, of Norac and two other defendants to 12 years in prison. The killings in the Lički Osik area, known as the Široka Kula massacre, resulted in the deaths of 40 civilians, mostly Croats but also some Serbs suspected of supporting Croatia. In 2011, a court in Belgrade, Serbia, convicted four former SAO Krajina militiamen of killing four Serbs and a Croat in Široka Kula.

In 1993, Croatian authorities charged Marcel Dusper, Tomo Čačić, Jovo Kuprešanin, Bogdan Odanović, Relja Tomić, Duško Bajić, Dane Drakula, Mićo Vasić, Goce Koneski, Slobodan Dotlić, Dragoljub Lazarević, Radovan Radenković, Bratislav Milojković, Stevo Milošević and Miloš Bogdanović, 15 former JNA officers, posted in Gospić garrison in 1991 with war crimes against a civilian population. All of the defendants, except Drakula were tried in absentia. Drakula was acquitted, while Dusper, Tomić and Bajić were convicted and sentenced to 20 years in prison each while the remaining defendants were sentenced to 15 years. The rulings were upheld by the Supreme Court of Croatia in 1994. Dotlić was arrested on 18 October 2013 after he visited his parents living in Croatia. Prior to his arrest, Dotlić had requested a new trial, but after his arrest the charges against him were changed to armed insurrection but this was later dropped following the General Amnesty Act.
