= Operation Medak Pocket =

Military operation by the Croatian Army during the Croatian War of Independence

Coordinates: 44°27′22″N 15°30′26″E

- Part of the Croatian War of Independence
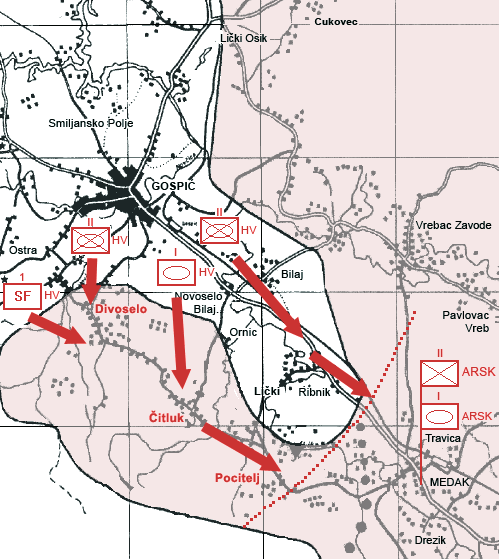
- Croatian advance during Operation Medak Pocket
Date	9–17 September 1993
Location	South of Gospić, Croatia
Result	Serbian–Canadian victory: Ceasefire; RSK airstrikes on Karlovac and Zagreb forced Croatian forces to withdraw; Canada secures Medak Pocket
Territorial changes	Croatian forces capture Divoselo and Čitluk but those are given under supervision to United Nations

Belligerents
Croatia	UNPROFOR: Canada; France; Serbian Krajina

Commanders and leaders
Janko Bobetko; Davor Domazet-Lošo; Mirko Norac; Rahim Ademi; Darko Turkalj †; Bernard Benček †; Ivica Antončić †; Bruno Bolanča †	James Calvin; Jean Cot Mile Novaković

Strength
2,500+ soldiers	2nd Battalion Princess Patricia's Canadian Light Infantry Battle Group (375 from PPCLI, 385 Primary Reserve, 165 other regular units) 800 soldiers 70 tanks

Casualties and losses
10 killed 84 wounded	4 wounded (Canada); 7 wounded 3 APCs lost (France) 52 killed 36 civilians killed (ICTY prosecution estimate)

Operation Medak Pocket (Serbo-Croatian: Operacija Medački džep, Операција Медачки џеп), officially called by Croatians Operation Pocket-93 (Operacija Džep-93) was a military operation undertaken by the Croatian Army between 9 – 17 September 1993, in which a salient reaching the south suburbs of Gospić, in the south-central Lika region of Croatia then under the control of the self-proclaimed Republic of Serbian Krajina, was attacked by Croatian forces. The pocket was named after the village of Medak.

The Croatian offensive temporarily succeeded in expelling rebel Serb forces from the pocket after several days of fighting. However, the operation ended in controversy due to a confrontation between the Croatian Army and United Nations peacekeepers as well as accusations of serious Croatian war crimes against local Serb civilians. Although the outcome of the battle against the Serbs was a tactical victory for the Croatians, it became a serious political liability for the Croatian government and international political pressure forced a withdrawal to the previous ceasefire lines. The area was eventually secured by UN troops.

According to UN and Canadian sources, UNPROFOR personnel and Croatian troops exchanged heavy fire, eventually resulting in the Canadian troops driving off a Croatian assault. In Canada, the battle was considered to be one of the most severe battles fought by the Canadian Forces since the Korean War.

== Background ==
By March 1991, tensions between Croats and Serbs escalated into the Croatian War of Independence. Following a referendum on independence that was largely boycotted by Croatian Serbs, the Croatian parliament officially adopted independence on 25 June. The Republic of Serb Krajina (RSK) declared its intention to secede from Croatia and join the Republic of Serbia while the Government of Croatia declared it a rebellion. Between August 1991 and February 1992, the RSK initiated an ethnic cleansing campaign to drive out the Croat and non-Serb population from RSK-held territory, eventually expelling as many as 250,000 people according to Human Rights Watch.

Much of the interior of the Lika region of southern Croatia was captured by the forces of the RSK and the Serb-dominated Yugoslav People's Army (JNA) during 1991. In Lika, almost all of the Croatian population in the Serb-held area was killed, expelled or forced to seek refuge in government-held areas, while the Serbs continued shelling of the Croatian city of Gospić throughout the year from their positions. A ceasefire was agreed in the January 1992 Sarajevo Agreement and a United Nations peacekeeping force UNPROFOR was installed to police the armistice lines and act as negotiators, aid-workers, and combat soldiers.

Despite this, sporadic sniping and shelling continued to take place between the two sides. Gospić, which was close to the front lines, was repeatedly subjected to shellfire from the Serbian Army of Krajina (SVK). The town was of great importance in securing lines of communication between Zagreb, Dalmatia and Rijeka. Much of the shelling took place from the Serb-controlled Medak Pocket, an area of high ground near Medak, Croatia approximately four to five kilometres wide and five to six kilometres long which consisted of the localities of Divoselo, Čitluk and part of Počitelj plus numerous small hamlets. The pocket was primarily a rural area with a combination of forest and open fields. It was fairly lightly inhabited before the attack, with about 400 Serb civilians residing in the area and was held by units of the SVK's 15th Lika Corps.

The pocket adjoined Sector South, one of the four United Nations Protected Areas (UNPAs) in Croatia. It was not actually in the UNPA but lay just outside in a so-called "pink zone"—RSK held territory outside the UNPAs, patrolled by UNPROFOR peacekeepers. Prior to the Medak Pocket offensive, Croatian government forces had launched several relatively small-scale attacks to retake rebel Serb-held territory in "pink zones" in the Miljevci plateau in June 1992 and the area of the Maslenica bridge in northern Dalmatia in January 1993—the Operation Maslenica. It has been alleged that the timing of the Maslenica and Medak offensives was owed to the political imperatives of Croatian President Franjo Tuđman, who was facing political difficulties following Croatia's intervention in the war in Bosnia.

During Croatian chief of staff Janko Bobetko's visit to Gospić area, he and his team concluded that the situation on that area of the front was unsatisfactory. It was especially critical on the Velebit mountain range, which was held by the members of the special police of the Croatian Ministry of the Interior. If these positions were overrun, the city of Gospić would become semi-surrounded. Croatian lines were also harassed by constant intrusions of smaller recon-sabotage groups that operated behind enemy lines. On 4 September one such group attacked Croatian positions on Velebit, which resulted in two Croatian policemen being killed.

Upon the Velebit attack, General Mladen Markač ordered the creation of a plan that would prevent further intrusions on territory held by the special police. When Bobetko learnt of that plan, he suggested fitting it into the plan of activities of the Croatian Army. From the beginning of September, the intensity of artillery attacks on wider area of Gospić also intensified. Bobetko therefore decided to run a small-scale tactical operation with the goals of partially neutralizing Serb artillery positions around city of Gospić, destroying enemy recon-sabotage group base in Divoselo, and shortening the length of Croatian frontline.

== The offensive ==
=== 9–14 September ===
The Croatian offensive involved around 2,500 troops drawn from the Croatian Army's Gospić Operational Zone. It began by preparatory fire of 9th Guards Brigade artillery batteries approximately at 06:10 on 9 September 1993. The attack was designed as the double envelopment maneuver in which tanks and infantry of the 9th Guards Brigade, starting from the Gospić suburb of Bilaj, provided one thrust of the attack, while commandos of Special Police of the Croatian Ministry of the Interior (MUP) starting from the Velebit mountain range provided a second thrust. The MUP units previously held vital Croatian positions on Velebit. These forces were also supported by the 111th Brigade of Croatian Army, Gospić Home Guard Regiment, and Lovinac Home Guard Regiment.. These two reinforced battlegroups successfully linked up same day at 14:00 in the village of Rajičevci, surrounding one battalion of the Serb militia and a number of Serb civilians in the Medak pocket. This was followed by mopping up operations. After two days of fighting, the Croatian forces had taken control of Divoselo, Čitluk and part of Počitelj. The salient was pinched out with the new front line running just in front of the village of Medak.

In accordance with their defense strategy called "Strategy of Real Threat", which envisioned deterring any Croatian attack of the self-proclaimed Republic of Serbian Krajina by bombarding Croatian cities in retribution, Serbian forces began to use long-range artillery (including FROG-7 ballistic missiles and M-87 Orkan) to bombard Karlovac, the Zagreb suburb of Lučko, Samobor and Jastrebarsko on 10 September. These indiscriminate attacks left dozens of civilians killed and wounded with extensive damage to homes and property. Seven civilians were killed and 23 wounded during an artillery attack on downtown Karlovac alone. On 9 September, Serb forces shelled and damaged an oil refinery in Sisak. On 13 and 14 September, MiGs-21 of the Croatian Air Force successfully destroyed some of the SVK artillery and rocket batteries on Banovina and Kordun, but one of the Croatian aircraft was downed by SA-6 near Gvozd, and its pilot, Miroslav Peris, was killed.

The SVK launched ground counter-attacks which retook some of the captured territory. It also threatened to attack 20 or 30 more targets throughout Croatia unless the captured territory was handed back. The two sides exchanged heavy artillery fire during 12–13 September, with the UN recording over 6,000 detonations in the Gospić-Medak area.

According to former SVK colonel Milislav Sekulić, one of the reasons for success of Croatian offensive on Medak Pocket was the poor combat readiness of SVK forces in that area. Notably, a month before, "[c]itizens and fighters of Divoselo" complained to their commanding officer that village defence consisted of only 30 people, out of which the youngest was aged 15 and oldest 72. At the same time, some of their men deserted from the frontline, only to engage in smuggling and other criminal activities around Knin.

=== 15–17 September ===
==== Ceasefire ====
The offensive attracted strong international criticism; facing political and military pressure at home and from abroad, the Croatian government agreed to a ceasefire. Major-General Petar Stipetić recalled that he was summoned in Zagreb by chief of staff Janko Bobetko on 15 September, where he met with him and four other UN officers. Bobetko handed him the ceasefire agreement; however, after Stipetić signed the document, Bobetko said that he would never sign that agreement, which angered Stipetić. Stipetić also said that order of withdrawal caused a lot of anger among Croatian soldiers, although he expected nothing less. According to him, certain commanders warned him not to go to their sector because their men want to kill him for signing the ceasefire. When he came in Gospić, he met with General Rahim Ademi, who asked him to try to get some time from UNPROFOR because battlefield sanitation was not completed at that point, therefore UNPROFOR gave him three days to fix the battlefield. On 15 September a ceasefire agreement was signed by General Mile Novaković on behalf of the Serbian side and Major-General Petar Stipetić on behalf of the Croatian side. The agreement required the Croatian forces to withdraw to their starting lines of 9 September and for Serb forces to withdraw from the pocket and remain withdrawn thereafter. The Croatian withdrawal was scheduled for 12:00 on 15 September.

In order to oversee the withdrawal and protect local civilians, UNPROFOR sent 875 troops of the 2nd Battalion Princess Patricia's Canadian Light Infantry Battle Group (2PPCLI BG), its rifle companies consisting of 50% to 80% augmentees from the army reserve, to move into the pocket, accompanied by two French Army mechanized units. The UN forces, under the command of Lieutenant-Colonel James Calvin, were instructed to interpose themselves between the Serb and Croatian forces.

==== Canadian buffer ====
"Operation Harmony" was the name given to the Canadian participation in UNPROFOR. The initial Canadian contingent, which deployed in March and April 1992, was drawn primarily from the 4 Canadian Mechanized Brigade Group based in Lahr, Germany. It was based on troops of the Royal 22^{e} Régiment, along with detachments from the Royal Canadian Regiment and 4 Combat Engineer Regiment. The Canadians were among the best trained troops at UNPROFOR's disposal, making them a natural choice for this dangerous task. They were equipped with M-113 armoured personnel carriers and carried a mix of M2 .50 caliber machine guns, C6 medium machine guns, C7 assault rifles, C9 light machine guns, and 84 mm Carl Gustav RCLs. The attached Heavy Weapons Support Company brought 81 mm mortars and a specially fitted APC armed with anti-tank guided missiles.

Croatian forces and other officials involved with the Medak Pocket Mission lost confidence in the UN's ability due to failed attacks on forces in the zone of separation between Krajina Serb forces. Earlier that year Croatian troops had launched an attack in order to seize a Peruća Lake power dam and reservoir. The dam was seriously damaged on 28 January 1993, in the aftermath of Operation Maslenica, at 10:48 a.m., when RSK forces attempted to destroy the dam with explosives. 30 tonnes (30 long tons; 33 short tons) of explosive was used, though the dam stood despite the damage inflicted. The Croatian communities in the Cetina valley were nevertheless in danger of being flooded by the lake water. The actions of Major Mark Nicholas Gray of the Royal Marines, deployed with UNPROFOR, prevented total collapse of the dam, as he had opened the spillway channel before the explosion and reduced the water level in the lake by 4 metres (13 ft). Subsequently, the Croatian forces intervened and captured the dam and the surrounding area. Consequently, the UN needed muscle in Sector South to rebuild its credibility in the eyes of many across the globe. 2PPCLI was sent from the north near Zagreb to the Krajinan region in Southern Croatia, near the Dalmatian Coast territory.

Location of the Medak Pocket. UN force dispositions are as of early 1995.

According to Canadian sources, Croatian forces, under the pretext of not receiving authorization from Zagreb, decided to attack the Canadian forces who were moving in between the Serb and Croat forces. Private Scott LeBlanc, who was present in the UN forces, recalls "[w]e started taking fire almost immediately from the Croats". When the Canadians began constructing a fortified position, the Croatians fired hundreds of artillery shells at them. The Canadians successfully used breaks in the shelling to repair and reinforce their positions.

The UN forces took control of abandoned Serbian positions but again came under fire from the Croatian lines, with the attackers using rocket propelled grenades and anti-aircraft guns. The UN troops then dug in their positions and apparently returned fire. As night fell, the Croatians attempted several flanking manoeuvres but the Canadians responded with fire against the Croatian infantry. The French used 20 mm cannon fire to suppress Croatian heavy weapons. The Croatian commander, Rahim Ademi, upon realizing that his forces could not complete their objectives, met with the Canadian commander and agreed to a ceasefire where his troops would withdraw by noon the next day.

According to Croatian version of events, Canadians started moving forward towards Croatian positions, while still having Serb troops right behind their back. The Croatian side interpreted this Canadian move as their non-completing of first phase of the agreement, which among other things included demilitarisation of area around Serb-held positions. At the same time, Serb forces located to the rear of the Canadians sniped Croatian positions; nevertheless, the order was issued not to open fire on UNPROFOR. Croatian soldiers received an order from Brigadier Ademi to fire only in self defence, and not to use heavy weapons and tanks. As the night fell the situation became unclear because Serb troops could not be clearly distinct from UNPROFOR forces, so gunfire was exchanged with the opposing side as a mean of deterrent for any kind of attack on Croatian positions. The following morning, Brigadier Ademi claimed to have become angry because UNPROFOR forces wanted to provoke his men, take new positions and thus allow Serbs to take their old positions back, so he allowed the implementation of phase two, which meant UNPROFOR troops crossing behind Croatian lines.

When the deadline passed, Canadian forces attempted to cross the Croatian lines, but were stopped at a mined and well-defended roadblock. Lieutenant-Colonel Calvin held an impromptu media conference with the roadblock as a backdrop, telling journalists that Croatian forces clearly had something to hide. The Croatian high command, realizing they had a public relations disaster on their hands, quickly moved back to their lines held on 9 September. The withdrawal was finally verified as having been completed by 18:00 on 17 September, bringing the offensive to an end.

The advancing Canadian forces discovered that the Croat army had destroyed almost all of the Serb buildings. In the burning wrecks they found 16 mutilated corpses. The Canadians expected to find many survivors hiding in the woods, but no Serb was found alive. Rubber surgical gloves littered the area, leading Calvin to a conclusion that there had been a clean-up operation. However, the UN's investigation suggested that these gloves may have been ordinary precautionary measures by the Croatians to deal with the legitimate dead and wounded. Photographs of Canadian personnel also shows them using surgical gloves. Everything was recorded and handed over to the International Criminal Tribunal for the Former Yugoslavia (ICTY). ICTY indicted Ademi in 2001, charging him with crimes against humanity, but he was ultimately acquitted.

On 27 April 1998, Lieutenant-Colonel Calvin reported that "the Croatians reported that 27 of their members were killed or wounded during the fire fights with [his] battle group during the 14 days [sic] in Medak". The same report indicates four Canadians wounded in initial artillery barrage, seven French soldiers injured by land mines, three French APCs and a front-loader lost to land mines, a Canadian killed and a further two injured in collision of their jeep with a Serb truck. Calvin's report does not identify the Croatian casualty report or its source. Various Canadian sources (Ottawa Citizen, Tested Mettle, Chances for Peace) have said that 27–30 Croatian soldiers were killed in an apparent clash with Canadian peacekeepers. The source of this number is alledegly some kind of information published by Croatian Radio Television as well as video footage broadcast by it. In his study "Human Losses in Operation Medak Pocket", author Miroslav Međimorec claims that he did a search of the entire Croatian Radio Television's archive, but was unable to find the alleged footage or any source of that number. He also holds it possible that the footage no longer exists. Even though the operation was considered a success, due to the emerging Somalia Affair, the clash was not highly publicized at the time.

Canadians trained to deal with foreign populations and authorities have to deal with conflicting parties as a non-enemy participant with knowledge and the caution that one side would become the enemy. Canadian peacekeepers are also taught how to deal with human rights violations, especially those that many Canadians had to face in the Medak Pocket where war crimes occurred. Most importantly they have advanced knowledge of law and skills for armed conflict. The Canadian troops showed their ability to immediately stand down when Croatian forces ceased fire and the Canadians reverted to their role as impartial peacekeepers.

The French Lieutenant-General Jean Cot, who was in charge of the operation and Calvin's superior officer, said:

"It was the most important force operation the UN conducted in the former Yugoslavia ... While we could not prevent the slaughter of the Serbs by the Croatians, including elderly people and children, we drove back to its start line a well-equipped Croatian battalion of some thousand men. Together, the Canadians and the French succeeded in breaking the Croatian lines, and with their weapons locked and loaded and ready, firing when necessary. They circled and disarmed an eighteen-soldier commando from the Croatian Special Forces who had penetrated by night into their location. They did everything I expected from them and showed what real soldiers can do."

— UNPROFOR French Lieutenant-General Jean Cot

The group that UNPROFOR disarmed were members of the Croatian Special Police who ended up in demilitarised zone and were disarmed at gunpoint. At first they refused to hand over their weapons, but after receiving a radio order from their commander, Mladen Markač, they complied with the request. After that, they were escorted out of the demilitarised zone and handed over to Croatian authorities. Their weapons were afterwards delivered by a Canadian officer who threw them demonstratively in the mud in front of them and walked away without saying a word. Several cases were also recorded of Canadians entering 1.5–2 kilometers too deep behind the agreed lines and crushing Croatian road obstacles using their vehicles. After UNPROFOR took control of the demilitarised zone, Canadians allowed incursions of Serb soldiers in the demilitarised zone, and Serb attacks on Croatian soldiers from there resulted in the wounding of one Croatian soldier. Such behaviour of Calvin's men resulted in increased diplomatic activity in the following days to calm the tense situation in the field. In one such meeting General Bobetko also mentioned other Croatian frustrations with UNPROFOR's peacekeeping prior to the Medak Pocket offensive:

"...you knew exactly that Serbian artillery at Sveti Rok, located right behind UNPROFOR's positions permanently pounded our positions. We weren't able to return to that fire because we would then have to hit you. I've personally pointed you out, three or four times that, should this continue, we will not have other choice but to open fire. You were, therefore warned, but you did nothing...."

— General Janko Bobetko to General Jean Cot

==== Croatian denial ====
Several sources deny that Canadian forces engaged in combat at Medak Pocket. The exchange of fire is described as a "minor incident" of sporadic firefights in Croatian sources. Serbian sources also fail to mention "the battle" in their own view of operation Medak pocket.

Of the 875 soldiers in the 2nd Battalion Princess Patricia's Canadian Light Infantry, only 375 came from the regular unit; the rest were augmentees – 385 Primary Reserve soldiers and 165 from other regular force units. In fact, reserve soldiers made up 70% of rifle company strength during the mission due to the requirement for highly skilled and experienced regular soldiers in support and technical trade positions. This includes 7 out of the 12 platoon commanders who came from reserve battalions as Reserve Entry Scheme Officers (RESO). Nevertheless the 2 PPCLI Battlegroup in Croatia contained the highest concentration of reserve soldiers on an operational mission to date.

"There was no time to properly exercise the companies, let alone the whole battalion...No one could know that the 2 PPCLI platoons would be called upon to gel together and go into action as a full battalion."

Alpha and Bravo Companies arrived in the area (Sector South's Medak Pocket) from Sector West on 7 September 1993, just 48 hours before the Croatian offensive started.

"UNPROFOR have been successful in the first 24 hours of the mission. After a few difficulties they managed to cross the crossing point onto the Croatian side and the first company moved into the front lines of the Croatian forces. The Croatians then withdrew so within two and a half hours there was a buffer zone in place. There has been sporadic fire at UNPROFOR from the Croatian side."

— Colonel Jim Calvin, UNTV 1993-09-17

UNTV reports (1993-09-18) on the actions of CANBAT and CIVPOL after UNPROFOR had successfully crossed Croatian lines to set up a buffer between Croatian and Serbian forces in the Medak pocket. Includes interviews with civilians caught up in the recent Croatian offensive.

In an interview with three CANBAT soldiers they explained that they arrived 48 hours ago to observe the area and take up a position on the earth embankment fifty metres from where they had first come in between the opposing sides. They explained that in process of replacing the Serb lines, they came under direct and indirect fire from the Croatian lines and, following the UNPROFOR rules of engagement, they did return fire but with small arms only. The soldiers said that there were no casualties on their side, that the Serbs have a couple of casualties, and they have no knowledge of any Croatian casualties.

Major-general Petar Stipetić "categorically rejected any insinuations of an armed conflict between Croatian troops and the UN in the Medak Pocket", although he mentioned an incident on the second day of the Croatian withdrawal when a French APC got stuck in a minefield, for which a Croatian commander ordered his engineers and medical corps to rescue the Frenchmen.

In 2002 the Croatian newspaper Nacional published a report claiming that "the armed conflict between the Croatian and Canadian forces in operation Medak Pocket from 9 to 17 September 1993 never happened" and that the Canadians had fired "no more than a couple of shots into the night." The same newspaper also claimed that autops on Croatian soldiers killed during the Operation Medak Pocket revealed that none of them died from the weapons that Canadians had in their arsenal at the Medak Pocket. Retired Croatian admiral Davor Domazet-Lošo, testifying at the 2007 trial of general Mirko Norac, commanding officer of the 9th Guards Brigade in September 1993, and general Rahim Ademi, commanding officer of the Gospić military district at the time, denied Canadian claims of the scale of the armed conflict with UNPROFOR and 26 Croatian fatalities resulting from the battle. He went on to say that he wonders if the 26 victims were actually Serbs. This was denied by Lieutenant-Colonel Calvin and decorated Canadian Army veterans who served at Medak. The Croatian authorities, both civil and military, during the aftermath of the skirmish with the UN forces and in the years that followed, have never stated that any serious battle with UNPROFOR forces in the Medak area ever occurred and claim that the Canadian forces' version of events is politically motivated. Domazet also invited the Canadian side to show where are the graves of 26 Croatian soldiers "that they killed in non existing clash for which they received 800 medals".

==== Serbian denial ====
Croatian author Miroslav Međimorec gained access to the battle reports of the SVK's 3rd Motorised Brigade, which was stationed near the Canadian UNPROFOR forces on 16 and 17 September 1993. The reports, although written in confusing manner, mention only occasional provocations coming from Croatian side in this period, to which the Serb side answered with small arms fire. The author concluded, based upon this testimony alone, that the clash between Croatian forces and the UN either was not fierce enough to be mentioned by the person writing the report or it did not happen at all. In his paper "Medak Pocket: Canadian Interpretation - Canadian Sources", he wrote that Canadian soldiers' accounts "are contradicted by the nature of the firefights" and that they usually come down to bare bragging instead of speaking of the real witnessed event.

=== Nielsen denial ===
Retired Royal Danish Army colonel Vagn Ove Moebjerg Nielsen, who was UNPROFOR commanding officer in the area at the time but was not present for the battle nor its aftermath, testifying at the Ademi–Norac trial, denied that there was any armed conflict between the Canadian and Croatian troops except for a single incident when the Canadians deployed in front of Serb-held positions; he said that the Croatian Army fired shots but the Canadians did not return fire. He added that the firing stopped when Croats realized that they were engaging the UN force.

=== Canadian view ===
In Canada, the event has been referred to as "Canada's secret battle". The Medak Pocket was an event that challenged the skill and discipline of an army that had not deployed formed units to fight in a full-scale battle for almost 40 years. Military analysts have since written extensively of the effects the battle at Medak Pocket has had on the Canadian military, including the management of public information regarding the battle, and both the Canadian military's and the Canadian public's perception of what "peacekeepers" were trained to do. The battle did not gain widespread public attention in Canada at the time.

== War crimes investigations ==
The UN immediately began an investigation into the events at Medak. The task was hampered by the systematic destruction that had been carried out by the withdrawing Croatians. The UN forces found that (in the words of an official Canadian study on the incident) "each and every building in the Medak Pocket had been leveled to the ground", in a total of eleven villages and hamlets. UNPROFOR units recovered 18 bodies in the Medak Pocket at the immediate aftermath of the operation. Croatian authorities turned over another 64 bodies which they claimed they recovered at the Medak Pocket which were given to the Serbs' authorities. The investigation claimed that one of the factors which complicated the determination of military status was that many civilians wore items of military clothing and many local military wore items of civilian clothing. The Croatians claimed that there were cases of two elderly women killed during the attack. They said that one was killed while operating an anti-aircraft battery and another blew herself up using a grenade to avoid capture. The UN dismissed these claims in their report in 1994; however, several eyewitness at the Norac-Ademi trial in 2006 described in detail how that grenade incident happened.

Investigators from the International Criminal Tribunal for the Former Yugoslavia (ICTY) determined that at least 100 Serbs had been unlawfully killed and many others had suffered serious injuries; many of the victims were women and elderly people. 29 executed Serb civilians have been identified, as well as five Serb soldiers who had been captured or wounded. More were thought to have been killed, but the bodies were said to have been removed or destroyed by the Croatians. In addition, Serb-owned property was systematically looted and destroyed to render the area uninhabitable. Personal belongings, household goods, furniture, housing items, farm animals, farm machinery and other equipment were looted or destroyed, and wells were polluted to make them unusable. An estimated 164 homes and 148 barns and outbuildings were burned down or blown up. According to several eyewitness at the Norac-Ademi trials, one woman was impaled on a stake. Much of the destruction was said to have taken place during the 48 hours between the ceasefire being signed and the withdrawal being completed.

The US Department of State claimed that Croatian forces destroyed 11 Serbian villages and killed at least 67 individuals, including civilians. Several members of the Croatian military were subsequently charged with war crimes. The highest-ranking indictee was General Janko Bobetko. He was indicted for war crimes by the ICTY in 2001, but died before the case was heard by the court, and in consequence the trial was cancelled.

The wider area was under the jurisdiction of the Gospić Military District, commanded at the time by Brigadier Rahim Ademi. He was also indicted by the ICTY and was transferred there in 2001. In 2004, General Mirko Norac – who was already serving a 12-year jail sentence in Croatia for his role in the Gospić massacre – was also indicted and transferred to The Hague. The two cases were joined in July 2004, and in November 2005 the tribunal agreed to a Croatian government request to transfer the case back to Croatia, for trial before a Croatian court.

The trial of Mirko Norac and Rahim Ademi began at the Zagreb County Court in June 2007 and resulted in first-degree verdict in May 2008 whereby Norac was found guilty and given a seven-year sentence for failing to stop his soldiers killing Serbs (28 civilians and 5 prisoners), while Ademi was acquitted on the grounds that, there was a parallel chain of command ran by Domazet Lošo. The appeal went to the Supreme Court of Croatia, which rendered its verdict in November 2009, confirming the previous verdict but commuting Norac's sentence by a year. The final appeals were rejected in March 2010. The process was tracked for the ICTY prosecutor by the OSCE Zagreb office.

Former members of Croatian 9th Guards Brigade Velibor Šolaja and Josip Krmpotić were also found guilty of war crimes in the Medak Pocket. Šolaja was given a five-year prison sentence for murder of civilians, while Krmpotić was found guilty of arson and destruction of Serb-owned houses around Gospić, for which he received a three-year prison sentence. During court proceedings against Šolaja in 2014, another member of the 9th brigade, Josip Mršić admitted to killing an old civilian woman back in 2014. In March 2017, he was sentenced to three years in prison by the County Court in Zagreb, a ruling that was upheld by the Supreme Court in 2021.

== Aftermath ==
After the offensive, most of the villages in the area were destroyed and depopulated. Even today, the region is still largely abandoned, though some Serbs have since returned to it. The region remained, in effect, neutral ground between the warring sides until near the end of the war. It was recaptured by the Croatian Army on 4 August 1995 during Operation Storm, which ended in the defeat of the self-proclaimed Republic of Serbian Krajina.

The offensive also exposed serious weaknesses in the Croatian Army's command, control, and communications, which had also been a problem in Operation Maslenica earlier in the year.

The operation caused serious political difficulties for the Croatian government, which was heavily criticised abroad for its actions at Medak. The well-publicised accusations of war crimes, along with the Muslim-Croat bloodshed in Bosnia, led to Croatia's image being severely tarnished; in many quarters abroad, the country was viewed as having moved from being a victim to an aggressor.

The war crimes committed during the operation damaged the credibility of UNPROFOR as well, as its forces had been unable to prevent them despite being in the vicinity at the time. Boutros Boutros-Ghali, the UN Secretary-General, admitted that

"The 9 September 1993 Croatian destruction of three villages in the Medak pocket has, despite the robust action taken by UNPROFOR to secure the withdrawal of Croatian forces, further increased the mistrust of the Serbs towards UNPROFOR and has led to the reaffirmation of their refusal to disarm. In turn, this refusal to disarm, as required in the United Nations peace-keeping plan, has prevented UNPROFOR from implementing other essential elements of the plan, particularly facilitating the return of refugees and displaced persons to their places of origin in secure conditions."

The 2nd Battalion PPCLI Battle Group, was later awarded the Commander-in-Chief Unit Commendation for its actions in the Medak Pocket, the first Canadian unit ever presented this unit commendation.
