= Tihomir Orešković (officer) =

Croatian officer convicted of war crimes

Tihomir Orešković is a Croatian officer who was convicted of war crimes committed during the Croatian War of Independence in the 1990s. He served prison time between 2003 and 2012 for crimes against humanity, war crimes against the civilian population, and violations of international law in the Gospić massacre.

Described as "right hand man" to Croatian General Mirko Norac, he was charged along with Norac and three others. Orešković, Norac, and Stjepan Grandić were convicted on 24 September 2003 in Rijeka County Court while Ivica Rožić and Milan Canić were acquitted of all charges due to lack of evidence. The judges concluded that Orešković and Norac had ordered the abduction of civilians from their homes and cellars as well as their imprisonment and execution in and around Gospić, specifically "ordering and taking part in the killings of at least 24 Serbs ... in October 1991".

The case was appealed to the Supreme Court of Croatia which rendered a verdict in 2004 which established how Orešković, while formally a secretary to the government commissioner for the coordination of crisis headquarters within the jurisdiction of the Gospić Police Directorate, assumed the role of the head of the military police as well as civilian police units, and together with Norac directed them to commit numerous crimes.

In late 2012 Orešković was released from prison on parole, having served two thirds of his 15-year sentence.
