= Tigrovi =

Tigrovi may refer to:

- 1st Guards Brigade, nicknamed "Tigrovi"
- Serb Volunteer Guard, also nicknamed "Tigrovi" or "Arkanovi Tigrovi"
