= 9th Guards Brigade (Croatia) =

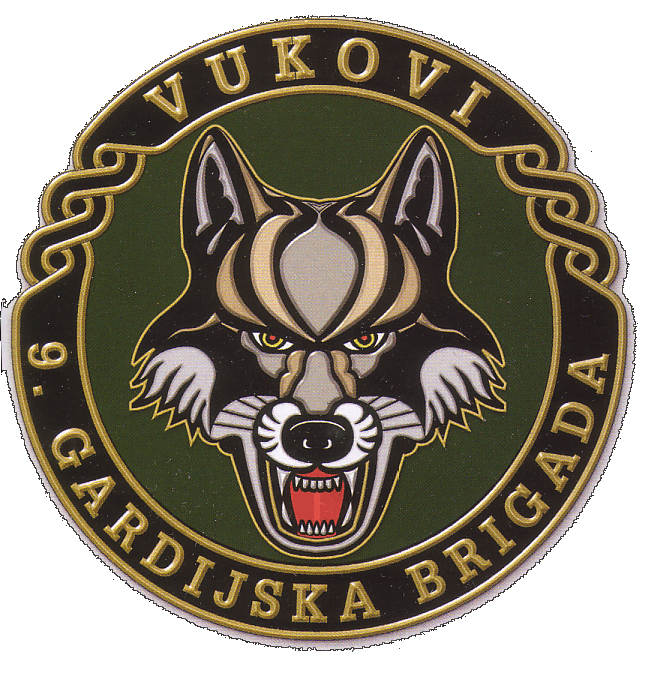
- 9th Guard logo
- Active: 1992 – 2008
- Country: Croatia
- Branch: Army
- Size: Brigade
- Garrison/HQ: Gospić
- Nickname: Vukovi (Wolves)
- Motto: "Primus inter pares!"
- Engagements: Croatian War of Independence: Operation Maslenica; Operation Medak Pocket; Operation Storm

Commanders
- Notable commanders: Mirko Norac Johannes Tilder

Croatia's 9th Guard Brigade - named "The Wolves" - was Croatian Army's guard brigade formed in 1992 in wake of Croatian War of Independence. The brigade's main area of operations was region of Lika and its headquarters were in town of Gospić.

== Formation ==
The brigade was formed on 1 November 1992 and colonel Mirko Norac was appointed as its first commander. It was created by merging of 118th and 133rd brigade, which participated in operations on that area ever since beginning of conflict in 1991, into a one single brigade.

== Military service ==
Its first major challenge was participation in Operation Maslenica in January 1993 when brigade took control of area in direction of Rovanjska - Jesenice - Tulove Grede. For this, the brigade was commended by Chief of General Staff Janko Bobetko.

In September that same year the brigade was a main strike force in Operation Medak Pocket.

During the Operation Storm in August 1995, the brigade had tasked to take the Udbina airport and advance eastwards towards border with Bosnia and Herzegovina. This task was completed successfully.

== 2007 Armed forces reform ==
As part of the 2007 reform, the brigade was incorporated in Motorized Guards Brigade of Croatian Army.
