= Gospić massacre =

1991 mass killings of civilians in Gospić, Croatia

Coordinates: 44°32′45″N 15°22′30″E

- Part of the Croatian War of Independence
- Gospić on the map of Croatia, Serb-held territories in late December 1991 are highlighted in red.
- Location: Gospić, Croatia
- Date: 17–25 October 1991
- Target: Predominantly Serb civilians
- Attack type: Summary executions
- Deaths: 100–120
- Perpetrators: Elements of the 118th Brigade of the Croatian National Guard, Gospić city police, Croat paramilitaries

The Gospić massacre was the mass killing of 100–120 predominantly Serb civilians in Gospić, Croatia, during the last two weeks of October 1991, during the Croatian War of Independence. The majority of the victims were ethnic Serbs arrested in Gospić and the nearby coastal town of Karlobag. Most of them were arrested on 16–17 October. Some of the detainees were taken to the Perušić barracks and executed in Lipova Glavica near the town, while others were shot in the Pazarište area of Gospić. The killings were ordered by the Secretary of Lika Crisis Headquarters, Tihomir Orešković, and the commander of the 118th Infantry Brigade of the Croatian National Guard, Lieutenant Colonel Mirko Norac.

The killings were publicised in 1997, when a wartime member of Autumn Rains paramilitary spoke about the unit's involvement in killings of civilians in Gospić in an interview to the Feral Tribune. No formal investigation was launched until 2000, after three former Croatian intelligence and military police officers informed the International Criminal Tribunal for the former Yugoslavia about the killings. Five, including Orešković and Norac, were arrested in 2001 and tried. Orešković, Norac and Stjepan Grandić were found guilty of the crime and sentenced to 14, 12 and 10 years in prison respectively in 2004.

== Background ==
In August 1990, an insurrection took place in Croatia centred in predominantly Serb-populated areas, including parts of Lika, near the city of Gospić, which also had a significant ethnic Serb population. The areas were subsequently named SAO Krajina and, after declaring its intention to integrate with Serbia, the Government of Croatia declared it to be a rebellion. By March 1991, the conflict escalated into the Croatian War of Independence. In June 1991, Croatia declared its independence as Yugoslavia disintegrated. A three-month moratorium followed, after which the decision came into effect on 8 October.

As the Yugoslav People's Army (JNA) increasingly supported SAO Krajina and the Croatian Police was unable to cope with the situation, the Croatian National Guard (ZNG) was formed in May 1991. The development of the military of Croatia was hampered by a UN arms embargo introduced in September, while the military conflict in Croatia continued to escalate—the Battle of Vukovar started on 26 August. By the end of August the fighting intensified in Lika as well, including in Gospic where fighting to control the city continued through much of September. Although Gospić was controlled by Croat forces, it remained under Serbian artillery bombardment after the battle. The fighting resulted in heavy damage to the town and the flight of the bulk of its population after which only about 3,000 residents remainined. Before the war, Gospić had a population of 8,000, including 3,000 Serbs. Many Serbs previously living in the town fled but Croatian authorities urged them to return through television and radio broadcasts.

As the civilian population started to return in late September, Gospić chief of police Ivan Dasović proposed that a list of the returning Serbs should be drawn up, ostensibly for security purposes. According to Ante Karić, President of the Lika Crisis Headquarters (krizni stožer), Dasović feared that the returning Serbs might harbour a fifth column, undermining defence of the town. Karić reportedly opposed the move, but the list was compiled on 10 October. A similar list of Serbs returning to nearby Karlobag was prepared on 16 October.

Gospić police were subordinated to control by the Lika Crisis Headquarters by dint of an order issued by the then Minister of the Interior Ivan Vekić as were the 118th Infantry Brigade of the ZNG and the military police based in Gospić. In addition, a paramilitary volunteer group, nicknamed "Autumn Rains", controlled by Tomislav Merčep, was deployed to Gospić in September; this unit was formally subordinate to the Ministry of the Interior.

== Killings ==
The Secretary of the Lika Crisis Headquarters, Tihomir Orešković, and the commanding officer of the 118th Infantry Brigade Lieutenant Colonel Mirko Norac, called a meeting of their subordinates and ordered the arrest of Serb civilians, their subsequent detention in the Perušić barracks, and killings. Sources disagree on the exact date of the meeting. According to Dasović, the meeting took place on 15 October, at approximately 9:00 p.m., which he attended along with several other officials. Other sources, including the subsequent criminal inquiry and trial witnesses, indicated the meeting was held on 16 or 17 October. The courts processing the case, including the Supreme Court of Croatia, determined that the meeting took place on 17 October and that Orešković and Norac ordered those in attendance to execute civilians that had been arrested based on the prepared lists. The killing of civilians in Široka Kula by Serbian paramilitaries, which took place on 13 October, was used as a pretext for the executions.

Most of the arrests occurred on 16–17 October, both in Gospić and Karlobag. The civilians, especially Serbs, were led away at gunpoint from bomb shelters starting on 16 October. Two days later, residents of Gospić witnessed civilians being loaded aboard eleven military lorries at the town's cattle market, never to be seen again. At least ten civilians were killed at Žitnik in the Gospić area known as Pazarište on 17 October. The killings continued at Lipova Glavica near Perušić on 18 October, where 39 or 40 people were executed by firing squad after being held in the Perušić barracks, where a battalion of the 118th Infantry Brigade was based at the time. Three additional Serb civilians were arrested in Gospić and Karlobag on 25 October. They were also shot and their bodies retrieved in the Ravni Dabar area on 3 December. Many of the victims were prominent Serbian intellectuals including doctors, judges and professors. Like the rest of murdered Serbs, they were loyal to the Croatian state and refused to join the Republic of Serbian Krajina, making their executions all the more heinous. The Croat victims of the massacre are believed to have been dissenters who opposed the state's Anti-Serb measures.

== Aftermath ==
The massacre in Gospić was the most significant such atrocity committed by Croats during the war. Sources disagree on the total number of fatalities in the Gospić massacre, with estimates ranging from nearly 100 to 120 killed. The official figures indicate that a total of 123 persons went missing in the area of Gospić between 1991 and 1995.

Ten victims were dumped in a septic tank and covered with layers of clay and stone rubble in Gospić, later discovered by International Criminal Tribunal for the former Yugoslavia (ICTY) investigators in May 2000, arousing complaints from the mayor of Gospić and street protests by Croatian veterans. Twenty-four additional corpses had been burnt and disposed of near Duge Njive, a village east of Perušić, but retrieved by the 6th Brigade of the JNA on 25 December 1991, examined and reburied in Debelo Brdo, 15 kilometres (9.3 miles) away from Udbina. Eighteen were buried in a mass grave while six others were buried individually, but these were disinterred and reburied elsewhere by relatives. The mass grave was excavated in December 2000 as a part of a criminal investigation. The victims' homes were looted in the immediate aftermath by the Autumn Rains unit. In 1992, several members of the unit were briefly imprisoned by Croatian authorities, but released without charge.

In September 1997, the now defunct Croatian newspaper Feral Tribune published a detailed eyewitness account by Miroslav Bajramović, one of the Autumn Rains troops, who claimed to have been involved in carrying out the massacre. In his interview, Bajramović stated that the unit was ordered to ethnically cleanse Gospić. He also claimed they were occasionally ordered by Tomislav Merčep, who had been an ally of Croatian President Franjo Tuđman, to "terminate" prisoners, and that Vekić was fully aware of their task. Bajramović and three other members of the unit identified in the interview were arrested, while Vekić denied Bajramović's claims and Croatian government officials denied any responsibility in the matter. In turn, the ICTY requested information on the four. Tudjman blamed the massacre on Serbs and foreign agents. He briefly arrested a Croatian militia leader connected to the killings, but later released him and assigned him to the Interior Ministry.

By 1998, two Croatian intelligence officers and a military police officer, Milan Levar, Zdenko Bando and Zdenko Ropac, approached the ICTY offering information concerning the events. Levar, who was later murdered, was particularly valuable as a witness as he claimed to have witnessed the deaths of about 50 people in the Gospić area. Ranko Marijan, the Justice Minister in a new government, criticised his predecessors and the police for their failure to pursue the case, but the authorities failed to protect Levar, who was murdered by car bomb on 30 August 2000. The investigation of the killings in Gospić was a contributing factor in the criticism of the government's efforts by seven active duty and five retired Croatian generals who issued the Twelve Generals' Letter making their grievance public. That led to sacking of the seven active duty officers, including by President Stjepan Mesić. The group included Norac, who had held the rank of major general since September 1995.

=== Trial of Orešković et al. ===
A formal inquest of the killings in Gospić was launched in late 2000 and warrants for the arrest of Orešković, Norac, Stjepan Grandić, Ivica Rožić and Milan Čanić were issued in February 2001. Norac evaded arrest for two weeks, convinced that the authorities intended to extradite him to the ICTY. Relatives of Grandić, Rožić and Čanić, aided by residents of Gospić, attempted to prevent the police from arresting the three by surrounding the police vans sent to transport the defendants to custody. The opposition to the prosecution culminated in a 150,000-strong street protest in Split on 11 February. The protests were repeated in Zagreb, where 13,000 protesters appeared. Norac surrendered on 21 February after he received assurances that he would be tried in Croatia rather than by the ICTY.

A formal indictment was brought forward on 5 March, charging the five with the killing of 50 civilians in Gospić and Karlobag. The case was tried in Rijeka County Court, and included the testimony of 120 witnesses in the Rijeka court, 18 survivors of the 1991 attacks in Gospić who testified in Belgrade, and two Croatian nationals who fled to Germany fearing for their own safety. One of these two, surnamed Ropac, refused to testify because he distrusted government assurances regarding his safety. In March 2003, the Court found the defendants guilty; Orešković was sentenced to 15 years in prison, while Norac received a sentence of 12 years in prison. Grandić was imprisoned for a term of 10 years. Rožić and Čanić were acquitted due to lack of evidence against them. The case was ultimately appealed all the way to the Supreme Court of Croatia in 2004, which upheld the first-instance convictions of Orešković, Norac and Grandić, as well as the acquittals of Rožić and Čanić. A BBC News analysis claimed the trials indicated a willingness on the part of the Croatian government to deal with war crimes committed by its nationals, following a long period of inactivity described by Rijeka County Court judge Ika Šarić as a "conspiracy of silence".

Bajramović and four other members of his unit were convicted in an unrelated case of killing and abuse of Serb and Croat civilians committed in Poljana near Pakrac in 1991. They received prison sentences ranging from three to twelve years. As of 2013, Merčep is on trial charged with command responsibility in war crimes committed in Poljana.

== See also ==
- List of massacres in Croatia
