= Divoselo =

- Village
- Interactive map of Divoselo
- Location within Croatia
- Coordinates: 44°29′46″N 15°21′51″E
- Country: Croatia
- County: Lika-Senj
- Municipality: Gospić

Area
  - Total: 46.1 km^{2} (17.8 sq mi)

Population (2021)
  - Total: 1
  - Density: 0.022/km^{2} (0.056/sq mi)
- Time zone: UTC+1 (CET)
  - Summer (DST): UTC+2 (CEST)

Divoselo (Serbian Cyrillic: Дивосело) is a village in the Gospić municipality in the Lika region of central Croatia. It is located near Gospić, connected by the D25 highway.

== History ==
During the WWII Genocide of Serbs by the Croatian fascist Ustaše regime, more than 900 Serbs were massacred in Divoselo.

The Serb community was ethnically cleansed from the area during the Operation Medak Pocket (September 1993) of the Croatian War (1991–95), when the Croatian Army took it from the break-away Republic of Serbian Krajina. Earlier, the Battle of Gospić (1991) included firefights between the Yugoslav People's Army and the Croatian National Guard in the village.

== Demographics ==
The 1712–14 census of Lika and Krbava registered 589 inhabitants, all of whom were Serbian Orthodox ("Vlach").

The 1991 census registered 344 residents, out of whom 304 were ethnic Serbs. The 2011 census registered 4 residents.

Historical population 1857-2011
v

population	1844	1988	2005	2148	2222	2001	2128	2164	679	697	628	505	407	344	12	4
	1857	1869	1880	1890	1900	1910	1921	1931	1948	1953	1961	1971	1981	1991	2001	2011

Sources: Croatian Bureau of Statistics publications

== Notable natives and residents ==
- Nada Dimić (1923–1942) - antifascist, partisan and People's Hero of Yugoslavia
- Mile Počuča (1899–1980) - antifascist, partisan and People's Hero of Yugoslavia

== Bibliography ==
=== Biology ===
- Šašić, Martina; Nahirnić, Ana; Tarmann, Gerhard M. (2016-12-31). "Zygaenidae (Lepidoptera) in the Lepidoptera collections of the Croatian Natural History Museum". Natura Croatica: Periodicum Musei Historiae Naturalis Croatici. 25 (2): 233–248. doi:10.20302/NC.2016.25.19. eISSN 1848-7386.
