= Karaçë =

Karaçë: Karaçë (Albanian); Караче/Karače (Serbian)
- Village
- Location within Kosovo
- Coordinates: 42°52′29″N 20°59′52″E
- Location: Kosovo
- District: Mitrovicë
- Municipality: Vushtrri

Population (2011)
  - Total: 192
- Time zone: UTC+1 (CET)
  - Summer (DST): UTC+2 (CEST)

Karaçë or Karače (Serbian Cyrillic : Караче) is a village in Kosovo located in the municipality of Vushtrri and in the district of Mitrovicë. According to the Kosovar census of 2011, it has 192 inhabitants, all of whom are Albanians.

== Demographics ==
Historical population

Year	Pop.	±%
1948	188	—
1953	225	+19.7%
1961	268	+19.1%
1971	304	+13.4%

Year	Pop.	±%
1981	293	−3.6%
1991	345	+17.7%
2011	192	−44.3%

== Notable people ==
- Rahim Ademi, Croatian army general

== See also ==
- List of populated places in Kosovo
