= Serbian Guard =

Serbian paramilitary unit

- Српска гарда Srpska garda
- Active: 1991–1992
- Disbanded: c. 1992
- Country: Yugoslavia; Serbian Krajina; Republika Srpska
- Allegiance: Serbian Renewal Movement
- Type: Paramilitary
- Size: ~40,000
- Garrison/HQ: Bor
- Engagements: Croatian War: 1991 Yugoslav campaign in Croatia; Battle of Gospić

Commanders
- Commander: Đorđe "Giška" Božović †

The Serbian Guard (Serbian: Српска гарда, romanized: Srpska garda) was a Serbian paramilitary active in the Croatian War with close ties to the Serbian Renewal Movement (SPO). Eighty percent of the guard's members were members of the SPO. The paramilitary was formed by SPO official Vuk Drašković and his wife Danica Drašković, along with Đorđe Božović and Branislav Matić.

== History ==
The paramilitary unit's training camp was located near Bor Lake in Serbia. It participated in clashes in Croatia near the town of Gospić. Elements of the unit also participated in the Bosnian War. The Serbian Guard was the smallest and weakest of all the Serb para-military groups operating in the early 1990s, and was the first to be disbanded. Vuk Drašković, a prominent intellectual in a society that idolised intellectuals, had emerged by 1990 as the best known political opponent of the Serb leader Slobodan Milošević and ran against him in the 1990 election. Consequently, Drašković's attempt in 1991 to set up a para-military group was opposed and hindered by the Serb authorities at every turn. The German political scientist Klaus Schlichte wrote that Drašković is "...an impulsive, emotional character, whose political strength lay in his rhetorical gifts rather than in his organizational and strategic capabilities". Schlichte wrote under Max Weber's typology of leadership, Drašković would be considered a demagogue rather than as a bureaucratic leader. Schlichte wrote that Drašković lent his name and prestige to the group, but others provided the actual operational leadership.

The majority of the members of the Serbian Guard came from the tough working class Voždovac district of Belgrade, and most were connected with the Voždovac gang that dominated organised crime in the Voždovac district in the late 1980s and early 1990s. Drašković seems to have turned to the Voždovac gang as the only way to get around the attempts of the Serb authorities to prevent him from setting up his own para-military group. The men who dominated the Serbian Guard was Branislav Matić, the owner of a used car dealership in Belgrade with extensive connections to organised crime and who was a prominent campaign donator to Drašković's Serbian Renewal Movement. Matić selected his friend, the gangster Đorđe Božović, to serve as the Guard's commander.

Đorđe Božović was the unit's first commander, but was killed in action near Gospić. Some people have alleged that Božović's death was an act of "friendly fire" orchestrated by the Republic of Serbian Krajina government. The unit's chief financier Branislav Matić was gunned down on 4 August 1991 in Belgrade. After the death of Božović, the unit was taken over by Branislav Lainović. Popular rumor in Belgrade had it that Matić and Božović had been killed by the SBD security service as a way to cripple the Serbian Guard.

The Serbian Guard had its own uniforms and ranks during its brief existence. After the deaths of Božović and Matić, the Serbian Guard fell apart in the fall of 1991, thought the group lingered on for several years afterwards, having a shadowy existence as an organised crime group. Drašković was harassed and imprisoned several times by the Milošević regime and largely ceased to have an active involvement in the Serbian Guard. All the leading figures in the Voždovac gang were killed over the course of 1993-1994 without the police making a single arrest in any of these murders. With the liquidation of the Voždovac gang as a force in the Belgrade underworld, the Serbian Guard ceased to exist. Schlichte wrote in Weberian terms, the Serbian Guard was an "zweckverein", an loose alliance of interests rather a formally organised group, which was reflected in its military failures during the Croatian war of 1991. Schlichte wrote that Drašković was an oppositional politician and intellectual who unwisely allied himself with an organised crime group in an attempt to win military glory that would booster his chances against Milošević while the Voždovac gang likewise wanted to set up para-military group to win political cover for their criminal activities. Beyond the divergent aims of the group's leaders, the Milošević regime was implacably hostile towards Drašković having his own para-military group that might one day challenge the Serbian state.

Yugoslavian colonel general Nebojša Pavković has called for Drašković to be tried for his role in the guard's formation. Having a pro-opposition political stance, the guard was never favoured by the government of the Federal Republic of Yugoslavia and Yugoslav security services.

== Notable members ==
- Đorđe Božović "Giška", Serbian career criminal and the founding father of the Guard, killed in action during the Croatian War.
- Branislav Matić "Beli" ("The White" or "Whitey"), founding father and chief financier, owner of large car junkyards in Belgrade. Gunned down in front of his house in 1991, presumably under the orders of the Yugoslav secret service who had been monitoring him since late 1980s.
- Branislav Lainović "Dugi", career criminal and former basketball player. Took control over the Guard after Božović's death. He moved to Novi Sad after the war where he became the kingpin of a local crime syndicate. He was gunned down in Belgrade in 2000 by the members of the Zemun Clan over Novi Sad turf control.
- Aleksandar Knežević "Knele", rising star of Belgrade underworld, and the underboss in the Voždovac gang. Assassinated in Hyatt hotel room in 1992, being only 21 at the time. Fought in the Battle of Borovo Selo.
- Vaso Pavićević "Pava", Montenegrin Serb capo and former boxer of "Radnički" boxing club. Gunned down in an ambush on Paštrovska Gora in 1996. He commanded the troops in Tenja in 1991.
- Žarko Radulović "Đaro", Montenegrin Serb career criminal. Gunned down in Brussels in 1997.

== See also ==
- List of Serbian paramilitary formations

== Books and articles ==
- Schlichte, Klaus (January 2010). "Na krilima patriotisma—On the Wings of Patriotism: Delegated and Spin-Off Violence in Serbia". Armed Forces & Society. 36 (2): 310–326.
