= Đorđe Božović =

Serbian paramilitary commander (1955–1991)

- Born: Đorđe Mićković; 16 September 1955; Peć, FPR Yugoslavia
- Died: 15 September 1991 (aged 35); Gospić, Croatia
- Burial place: Martinika Cemetery, Bezjovo, Podgorica
- Military career
- Allegiance: Serbia
- Service years: 1991
- Rank: Paramilitary leader
- Nickname: Giška
- Unit: Serbian Guard
- Conflicts: Croatian War; Battle of Gospić †

Đorđe "Giška" Božović (Serbian: Ђорђе Гишка Божовић; 16 September 1955 – 15 September 1991) was a Serbian criminal and paramilitary commander during the Yugoslav Wars.

== Biography ==
=== Early life ===
Božović was born Đorđe Mićković on 16 September 1955 in Peć to father Gavrilo "Gavro" Božović (1888–1964) and mother Milena (1927–2012) from Istok in Metohija. His father Gavro was involved with underworld activity and after killing a German man in Cologne, the family decided to change their surname to Božović after Gavro's father, Božo and went to the United States. Together with his mother and younger sister, Slavica, young Đorđe lived in Inđija until 1964. Then family moved to Belgrade, settling in the Voždovac neighbourhood. His arrival to Voždovac at age eight shaped the rest of Đorđe's life.

Growing up in a neighbourhood full of poor working-class families like his own, he often found himself a target of taunting and bullying by older kids. He fought back, earning respect and street credibility. He became lifelong friends with Branislav "Beli" Matić who got him into boxing at Radnički boxing club. Proficient at street fighting, preteen Đorđe already had run-ins with the police. Growing up, his nickname around the neighbourhood was Debeli (Fatso) due to his chubby frame. He got his famous nickname Giška apparently due to resemblance to a bear of the same name at the Belgrade Zoo.

At age thirteen, he illegally crossed the Yugoslav border into Italy just to show that he can circumvent SFR Yugoslavia's strict exit rules. Upon coming back, he befriended Boris Petkov a.k.a. "Bugarin (The Bulgarian)" and Ranko Rubežić. Together with Beli, the four men in their twenties formed an organized criminal crew in the Voždovac neighbourhood that would eventually expand into a mafia clan.

=== Criminal career ===
Giška had close ties to the Serbian mafia (he was friends with Ljubomir Magaš, whose respect he earned when he crossed illegally to Italy for the second time when he was 17 years old, to match Magaš in a fist fight) and Montenegrin mafia in his youth where he reached the rank of Boss. Giška's relationship with other prominent members of the Belgrade underworld was marked by alternating periods of close friendship and vicious feuding, often with deadly consequences.

In the late 1980s, together with gangster Željko "Arkan" Ražnatović and painter Dragan "Tapi" Malešević, Giška ran a nightclub called "Amadeus", located in the Belgrade neighbourhood of Tašmajdan. According to security operative Boža Spasić, they were allowed to open the club with the blessing of Yugoslav State Security (UDBA) as a reward of sorts for Giška's and Arkan's service to UDBA over the years. However, after discovering that in addition to regular activities the club was also being used for drug running, UDBA shut it down.

=== State Security Assassin ===
Božović, as well as the rest of the Yugoslav underworld, was frequently contracted by the SDB for the elimination of the political dissidents and state enemies. Giška was among the best agents service had, along with Arkan, because of his skills, knowledge of foreign languages and wits. He was often marked as the mastermind behind the Đureković operation, although these rumors were never confirmed. One of his famous actions involves planting a remotely controlled exploding phone at the door of the certain Albanian emigree in Switzerland as the warning sign. Božović apparently had a change of heart in 1986, when he was sent to Australia to assassinate Momčilo Đujić, a controversial WWII military leader and an influential figure among the Serbian emigration. Božović was impressed by the speech Đujić gave in Sydney and aborted the mission acting on his own hand. Yugoslav secret service never officially admitted tasking him with the mentioned assassination, but later severed all contacts with him. From then on, Božović became a public enemy, and quickly enrolled into opposition politics.

=== Return to Belgrade and politics ===
Božović returned to Belgrade in late 80s and quickly positioned himself as the leader of the Voždovac gang in his childhood neighbourhood. Among the rising stars of Belgrade's underworld, such as Aleksandar Knežević "Knele" and Goran Marjanović "Bombaš", Giška was perceived as a legend. Giška often acted as a negotiator, settling feuds between his own and other gangs. He held passionate speeches at gangsters' funerals, warning them that a bloody war in Yugoslavia is coming and that they have to stick together. He became highly involved in politics, admiring the then informal leader of the opposition Vuk Drašković. Božović, with his gang, actively participated in the 1991 riots in Belgrade. He is widely remembered for preventing the crowd to enter People's Republic Assembly saying, 'We will not allow for the loss of any Serb life'. During this period he also became a bodyguard for Drašković. He and Matić "Beli" started financing Drašković's SPO and became pivotal in consolidating its voters.

=== Serbian Guard ===
On 4 June 1991, Božović formed the Serbian Guard paramilitary force along with Serbian Renewal Movement (SPO) leader Vuk Drašković, Vuk's wife Danica Drašković, and Beli Matić. Božović was the unit's first commander.

The Guard faced many difficulties while being organised. State Security obstructed it from the very beginning, preventing its financing and pressuring its members to join the rival state-controlled Tigers. The Tigers were led by Arkan, with whom Giška parted in the mid '80s. Mutual friend, Serbian rock star Bora Čorba, in an interview in 2013 stated that he tried to consolidate the two, claiming Arkan was willing to do so, while Giška refused. The reason being that, apparently, Arkan abandoned Giška during the heist they were pulling together in Sweden when the police showed up.

The paramilitary unit's training camp was located near Bor Lake in SR Serbia, SFR Yugoslavia. It participated in clashes in the strategic Krajina area of SR Croatia near the Croat-held town of Gospić. Božović was killed in action in Gospić on 15 September 1991. The unit's chief financier Branislav Matić had been previously gunned down on 4 August in Belgrade. Elements of the unit also participated in the war in Bosnia and Herzegovina.

== Personal life ==
Božović had one daughter. He also had a sister named Slavica.

In October 2017, his remains were exhumed from the Central Cemetery in Voždovac and re-buried in a family plot in the Martinika Cemetery in Bezjovo, Podgorica Municipality, Montenegro.
