= Ranko Rubežić =

Serbian gangster and criminal

Ranko Rubežić (born 1951 in Peć, PR Serbia, FPR Yugoslavia — died 19 February 1985 in Belgrade, SR Serbia, SFR Yugoslavia) was a Yugoslav Montenegrin gangster.

A prominent crime figure in Belgrade known locally as the "Serbian Dutch Schultz", his February 1985 murder caused a media frenzy in communist Yugoslavia. It also marked the first case of gangland murder in Belgrade and Yugoslavia in the so-called 'sačekuša' style — something that would become a regular occurrence in the city and country throughout the 1990s and early part of the 2000s.

== Early life ==
Rubežić was born in Peć, Kosovo in 1951 to a poor family of Montenegrin origin, although his formative years took place in the Belgrade neighbourhood of Lekino Brdo where his family moved shortly after his birth. His father was a colonel in Yugoslav People's Army (JNA). Street fighting, petty theft, burglary break-ins, and stays in juvenile detention were a regular part of Rubežić's youth.

== Criminal career ==
In his early twenties, Rubežić emigrated to western Europe, spending time in West Germany, Belgium, the Netherlands, Austria, and Italy where he made a living through racketeering.

By the late 1970s, he returned to SFR Yugoslavia, building a reputation in Belgrade through thefts and racketeering, especially the city's downtown area. In doing so, he developed several new criminal techniques that had not been applied in Belgrade, such as racketeering various Belgrade state-owned hotels' front desk concierges who were known to pocket bribes for use of their rooms for prostitution. The police were alerted to his activity in 1978 after the management of Hotel Moskva's and Hotel Srbija's notified them of Rubežić harassment and maltreatment of their staff. The particular complaint resulted in criminal prosecution; he received a sentence of six months. Rubežić's half a year in jail—which he served in 1980 mostly in the Belgrade Central Prison's isolation ward—was marked by his asocial behaviour and fellow prisoners' reluctance to interact with him due to the street reputation that preceded him.

With his short stature and slim build, Rubežić's appearance differed significantly from his Belgrade underworld contemporaries such as Đorđe "Giška" Božović, Ljuba Zemunac, Željko "Arkan" Ražnatović, Rade "Ćenta" Ćaldović, etc. all of whom were physical large. Lacking in size, Rubežić made up for it in ruthlessness and sheer determination, becoming one of the first Belgrade criminals to carry a gun at all times as well as a small grenade. His other weapon of choice was an Israeli-made sawed-off shotgun, known locally as 'kratež'. Quiet and not very social, he struck fear into his opponents and acquaintances alike, many of whom preferred to stay away due to his moodiness and general behavioural unpredictability, including frequent violent outbursts.

Unlike many of his underworld friends and rivals, Rubežić was never contracted by the Yugoslav State Security Service (UDBA). This was mostly due to his lifestyle and manner of running his criminal activities towards the end of his life — following the 1984 altercation with his one-time friend turned foe Đorđe "Giška" Božović, Rubežić went into deep hiding, leading a paranoid and cautious existence, only surfacing to commit an odd crime.

Rubežić was murdered on 19 February 1985 in front of the Belgrade Eastern Gates in the Konjarnik neighbourhood by his associates Dragan "Dadilja" Popović and Miroslav "Vuja" Vujisić as well as Boris Petkov and Bojan Petrović. Popović and Vujisić got sentenced to 15 years in prison for the crime while Petkov and Petrović got 5 years each in later separate court trials.

Rubežić's murder is seen by many as a significant turning point in Belgrade underworld. Prior to its occurrence, gangster murders were rare in the city — the name of the game among Serbian criminals had mostly been humiliating and incapacitating a rival, not murdering him, however in the coming years that rapidly changed.

== Vendetta ==
After Rubežić's death, his godbrother Branislav Šaranović, the Montenegrin Don, attempted to avenge him. He was particularly enraged by the fact that Rubežić was killed after being a guest at his own house. Šaranović particularly targeted Boris Petkov and Bojan Petrović, whom he held as being most responsible. He made an attempt at Petkov's life after "Giška" Božović's funeral in 1991.
