= Krešimir Ćosić (politician) =

Croatian soldier and politician

Krešimir Ćosić (born 23 October 1949 in Zagreb, FPR Yugoslavia) is a Croatian soldier and politician.

== Background ==
He graduated from the Faculty of Electrical Engineering at the University of Zagreb in 1973, and later obtained a doctorate in 1984. Ćosić holds the rank of Lieutenant General of the Croatian Army. He was in active service between 1991 and 2000, when he was retired after signing the Twelve Generals' Letter. Since 2005, he has been leader of the Croatian delegation to the NATO Parliamentary Assembly.

== Politics ==
Ćosić attained a seat in the Parliament on the party list of Croatian Democratic Union at the 2003 and 2007 parliamentary elections.
