= Milan Levar =

Croatian military officer

- Born: December 23, 1954; Gospić, PR Croatia, FPR Yugoslavia
- Died: 28 August 2000 (aged 45); Gospić, Croatia
- Occupations: Mechanic, soldier, whistleblower
- Spouse: Vesna Levar
- Children: Leon Levar
- Awards: 2014 "Duško Kondor" Award for civil courage

Milan Levar (23 December 1954 – 28 August 2000) was a Croatian whistleblower, a former officer in the Croatian Army.

The Gospić-born Levar was murdered by a bomb placed under his car outside his house in Gospić on the 28th of August in 2000, because he had publicly campaigned for justice for victims of crimes committed during the Croatian War of Independence. After volunteering for the Croatian Army in 1991, according to reports, in 1992 he was ordered to round-up Croatian Serbs for execution which he refused. He had helped to defend the town in 1991 when local Serbs rebelled against Croatia's declaration of independence. In 1991 he witnessed Serbian civilians taken by truck to locations outside of Gospić where they were executed by military police squads and buried in hidden mass graves. Thereafter, he witnessed the plunder of their homes. Levar reported the crimes at the time they occurred but nothing was done. He was so shocked by his own side's actions that he left the military and decided to give evidence to the war-crimes tribunal in the Hague.

After the war, he was contacted by the International Criminal Tribunal for the former Yugoslavia in the Hague and interrogated as a potential witness in 1997 and 1998 in connection with war crimes. He helped collecting evidence and finding other witnesses who were also interviewed by the Tribunal. Levar was murdered before giving his testimony in court.

Investigation into Levar's death has been so far unsuccessful. The Croatian authorities have stopped informing his widow of the progress of the investigation. She herself has received death threats from unknown individuals on several occasions. One of the concerns voiced by the witnesses as reasons for their unwillingness to give testimony about things they allegedly saw during the war is the prevailing impunity of the high profile military and political officials who were in position of power during the war. Despite the existence of publicly available information, including evidence from public court proceedings in Croatia, allegations against many of the officials have not been investigated.

== See also ==
- Gospić massacre
- Twelve Generals' Letter
