= Guards Mechanized Brigade (Croatia) =

- Gardijska mehanizirana brigada (GMBR)
- Active: 2007–present
- Country: Croatia
- Branch: Croatian Army
- Type: Mechanized infantry + Motorized infantry
- Size: Brigade
- Garrison/HQ: Knin
- Anniversaries: March 31st
- Equipment: Patria AMV Oshkosh M-ATV

Commanders
- Current commander: Brigadier Mirko Stošić

Guards Mechanized Brigade (Croatian: Gardijska mehanizirana brigada (GMBR)) is a combat-tactical military unit of the Croatian Army, and together with the Guards Armoured Mechanized Brigade, they make up the two combat capable formations of the Land Forces.

It is the successor of the Guards Motorized Brigade (GMTBR), which was formed by members of the 1st Guards Brigade "Tigers" and the 4th Guards Brigade "Spiders" and part of the 2nd Guards Brigade "Thunderbolts". With the previous reorganization, the 9th Guards Brigade "Wolves and several units from the 4th Corps of the Croatian Army were included in the 1st Guards Brigade.

In order to preserve the lineage and tradition of the Guards Brigades for their exceptional contribution to the Homeland War, the manoeuvre battalions of the Guards Mechanized Brigade were named after the wartime names of the Guards Brigades. Thus, the Guards Mechanized Brigade consists of four manoeuvre battalions:1st wheeled mechanized infantry battalion "Tigers",2nd wheeled mechanized infantry battalion "Thunderbolts",3rd wheeled mechanized infantry battalion "Spiders" and the wheeled motorized infantry battalion "Wolves".

Elements of the Brigade have been deployed to Golan Heights on UNDOF and to Afghanistan as part of ISAF.

== Main Role ==
The basic mission of the Guards Mechanized Brigade was established to preserve the sovereignty and territorial integrity of the Republic of Croatia, to halt and destroy enemy combat forces, to gain control over the assigned area of operation, including the population and key resources, and to be ready to conduct combat operations outside the state territory as part of multinational forces in order to protect the national interests of the Republic of Croatia as well as to provide assistance to the civilian institutions of the Republic of Croatia Croatia in the event of natural and technical-technological disasters.

Tasks of the Guards Mechanized Brigade:

- Plan and conduct the tasks related to military operations
- Prepare training and activity with accordance of domestic defence doctrine
- Organize, conduct, evaluate and analyze training of subunits in order to achieve mission tasks
- Take part in national and international military operations, exercises and military cooperation
- Provide information and reports to the higher headquarters concerning implementation of training and activity plans
- Provide assistance to state and municipal institutions by responding to threats of a non-military nature
- Maintain close relationship with the local community and participate in their activities

== Structure ==
- Brigade Command (Knin)
  - Command Company (Knin)
  - 1st Wheeled Mechanized Infantry Battalion "The Tigers" (Petrinja)
  - 2nd Wheeled Mechanized Infantry Battalion "The Thunderbolts" (Petrinja)
  - 3rd Wheeled Mechanized Infantry Battalion "The Spiders" (Knin)
  - Wheeled Motorized Infantry Battalion "The Wolves" (Gospić)
  - Mixed Artillery Battalion (Karlovac/Slunj)
  - Air Defence Battalion (Benkovac)
  - Artillery battalion (Benkovac)
  - Engineer Battalion (Sinj)
  - Reconnaissance Company (Knin)
  - Signals Company (Knin)

== Composition ==
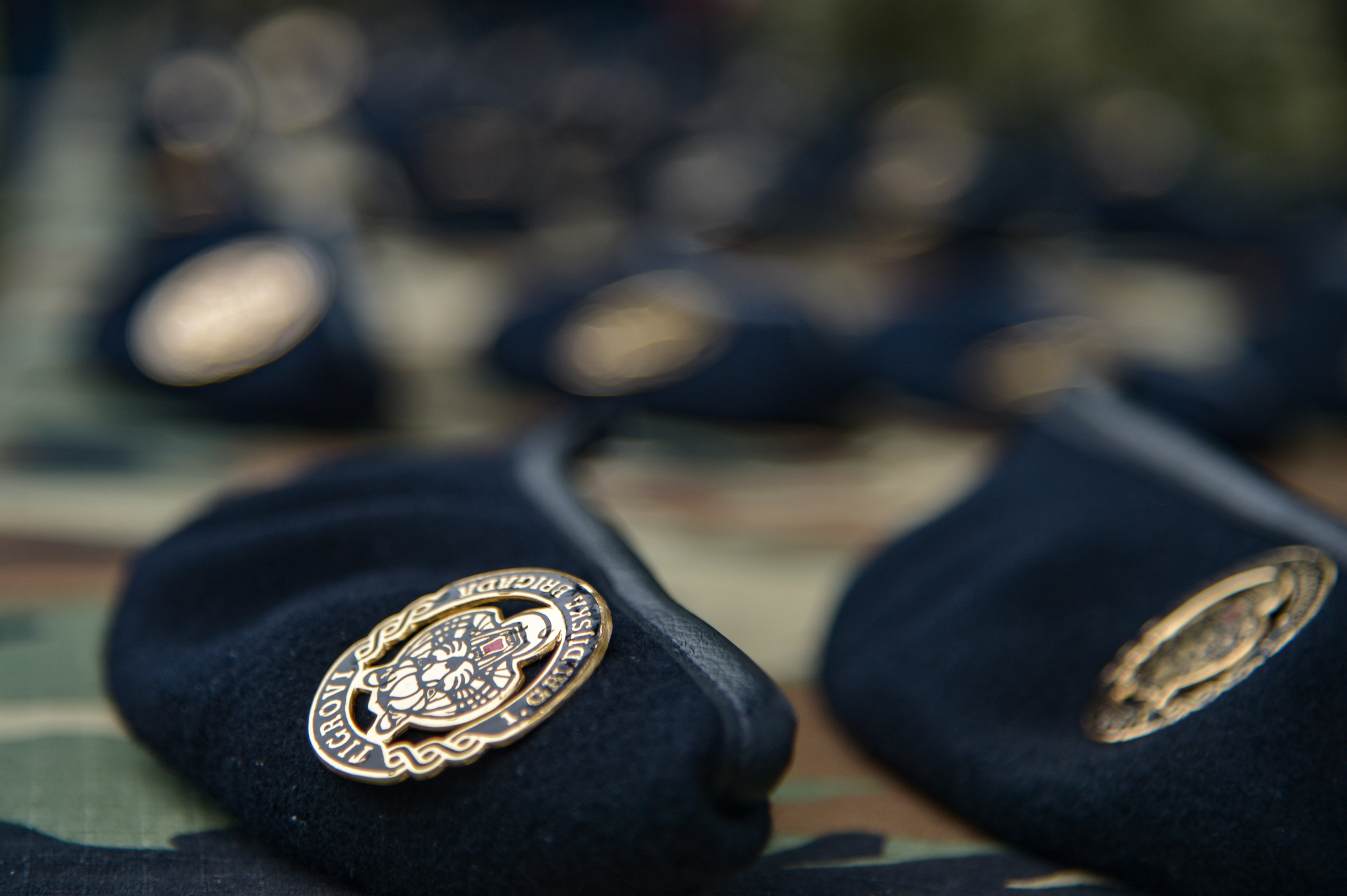
Berets of the 1st Wheeled Mechanized Infantry Battalion ''The Tigers''

The Guards Mechanized Brigade (GMBR) is the successor of the Guards Motorized Brigade (2007-2016), which was formed by members of the 1st Guards Brigade "Tigrovi", the 2nd Guards Brigade "Gromovi", the 4th Guards Brigade "Pauci" and the 9th Guards Brigade "Vukovi". The formation of these war units began on November 5, 1990, when the 1st Guards Brigade "Tigers" was formed in Rakitje. Under the motto, "fighting for Croatia like a tiger", it received numerous awards and praises for its war successes, and in January 2003 it merged with the 9th Guards Brigade "Wolves" into a new unit. Today, the 1st Mechanized Battalion of the Guards Mechanized Brigade is the bearer of the tradition and celebrates the anniversary of the 1st Guards Brigade and the Battalion Day on November 5. The headquarters of the 1st Wheeled Mechanized Infantry Battalion "Tigrovi" is in the barracks "Pukovnik Predrag Matanović" in Petrinja.

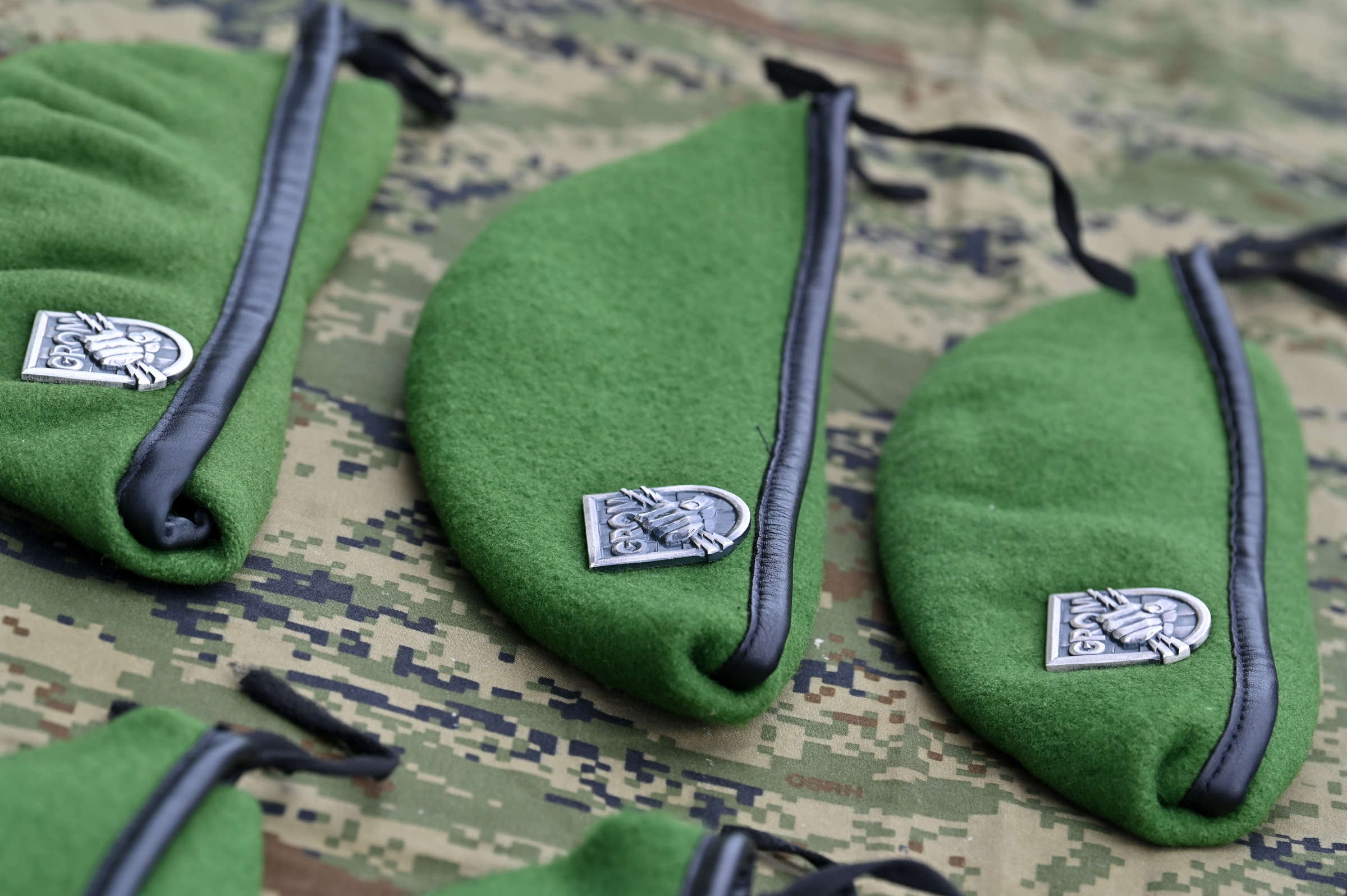
Berets of the 2nd Wheeled Mechanized Infantry Battalion ''The Thunderbolts''

The 2nd Guards Brigade was established on 15 May 1991 in the "Trstenik" barracks near Dugo Selo. With the motto "Once a thunder, always a thunder", she was one of the leaders of the creation of the future Croatian Army. During the reorganization, the 81st Guards Battalion became part of it, and in 2003 there was a new organization and merger with the 7th Guards Brigade. The Second Guards Brigade was awarded numerous awards and commendations for its contribution to the Homeland War. Today, the 2nd Wheeled Mechanized Infantry Battalion of the Guards Mechanized Brigade is the bearer of the tradition. The headquarters of the unit is in the barracks "Pukovnik Predrag Matanović" in Petrinja and on May 15 it celebrates the anniversary of the 2nd Guards Brigade and the Battalion Day.

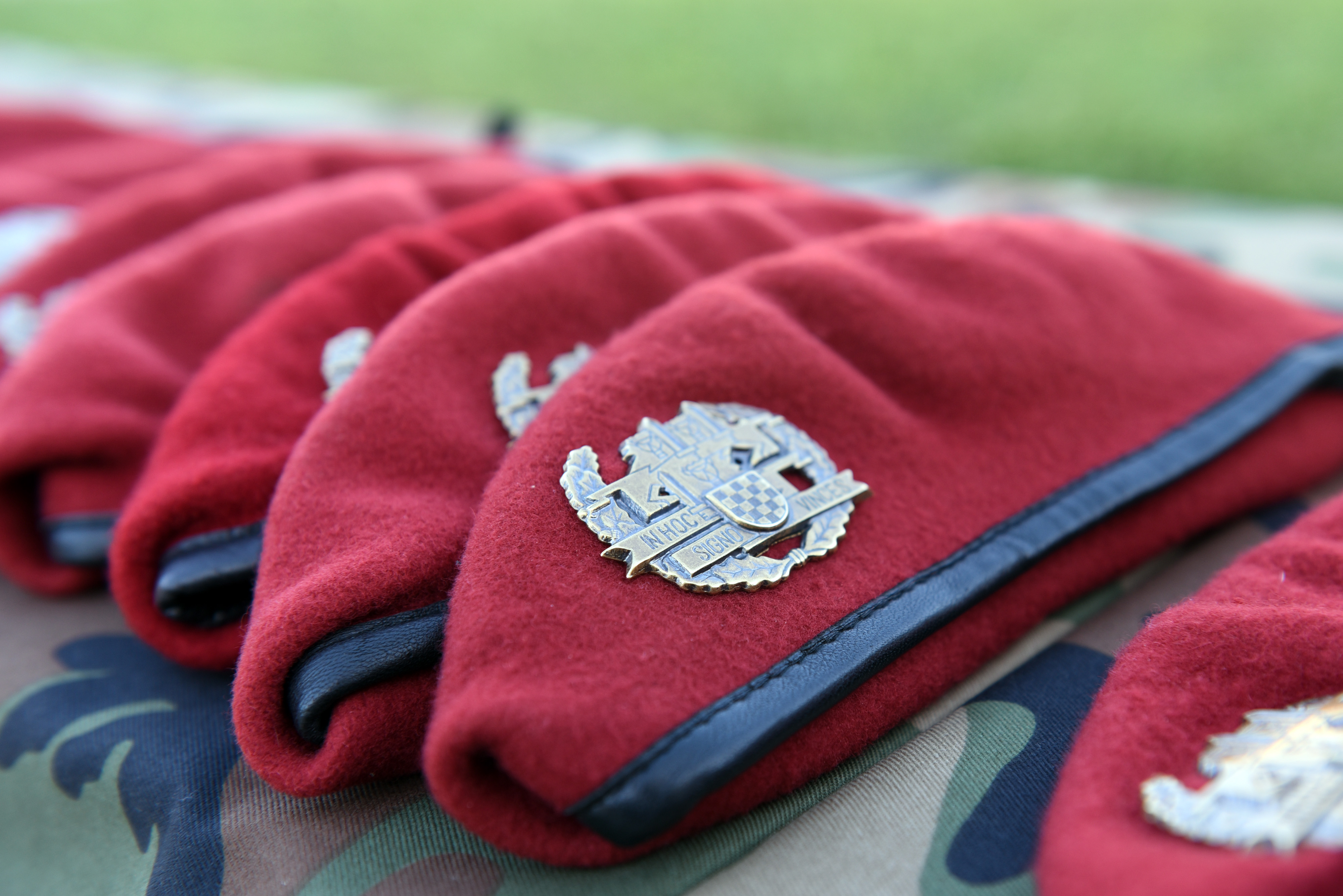
Berets of the 3rd Wheeled Mechanized Infantry Battalion "The Spiders"

On April 28, 1991, the 4th Guards Brigade of the National Guard Corps was established. Volunteers from the wider area of central Dalmatia joined the police officers in the camps in Resnik, Trilj and Imotski. It consisted of four infantry battalions that were deployed in the area of Split, Sinj, Imotski and Drniš. The 4th Guards Brigade "Pauci", guided by the motto "Under this sign you will conquer", brigade won numerous victories during the Homeland War, for which it received numerous awards and commendations. The bearer of the tradition of the 4th Guards Brigade "Pauci" is the 3rd Wheeled Mechanized Infantry Battalion "Pauci" of the Guards Mechanized Brigade and its headquarters is in the barracks "King Zvonimir" in Knin. The anniversary of the 4th Guards Brigade and the Battalion Day is April 28.

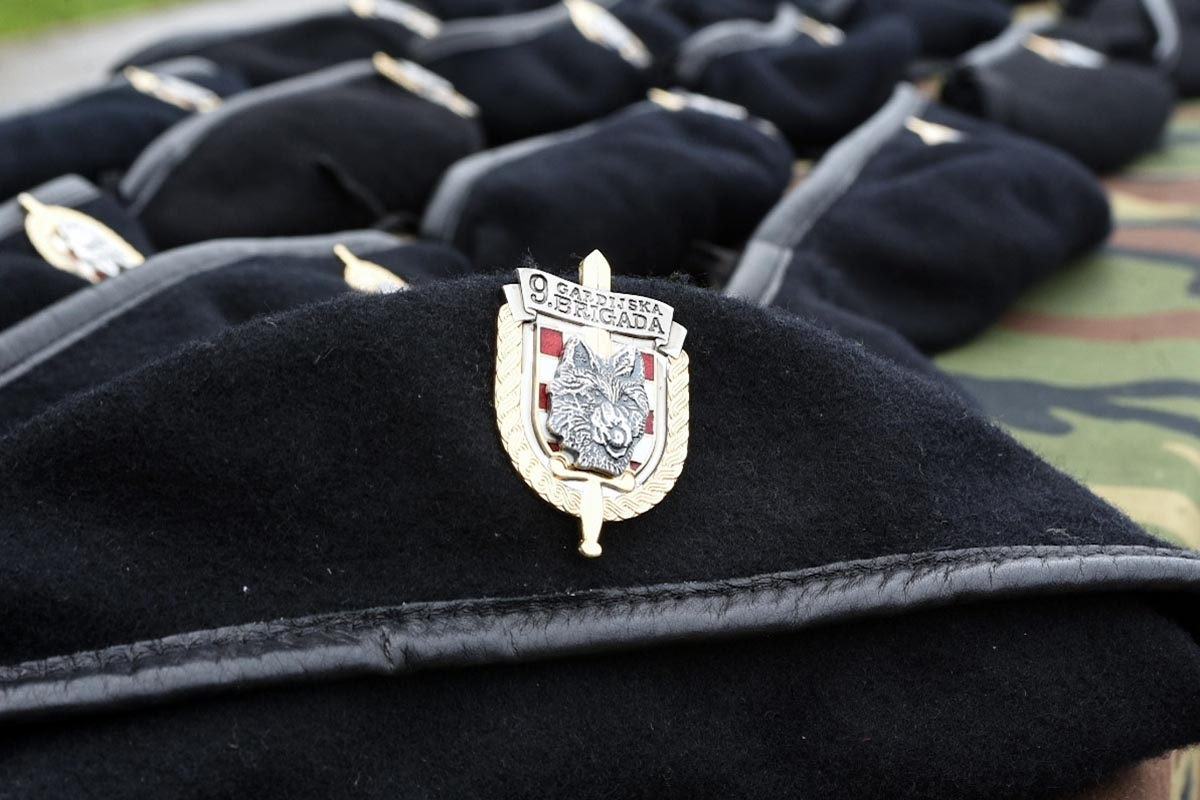
Berets of the Wheeled Motorized Infantry Battalions "The Wolves"

During September 1992, the formation of the 6th Guards Brigade of the Croatian Armed Forces was being prepared. It was formally established on 1 November 1992 by order of the Minister of Defence of the Republic of Croatia and later renamed the 9th Guards Brigade "Wolves". The basis of the unit was the 118th and 133rd Brigades of the Croatian Army, and its members, under the motto "First among equals", are today part of the 1st Motorized Battalion "Wolves" of the Guards Mechanized Brigade. They are celebrating the anniversary of the 9th Guards Brigade "Wolves" and the Battalion Day on November 1. The headquarters of the Wheeled Motorized Infantry Battalion "Wolves" is in the barracks "Eugen Kvaternik" in Gospić.

== See also ==
- 1st Guards Brigade (Croatia)
- 2nd Guards Brigade (Croatia)
- 4th Guards Brigade (Croatia)
- 9th Guards Brigade (Croatia)
