= Počitelj, Gospić =

Počitelj
- Village
- Interactive map of Počitelj
- Location of Počitelj in Croatia
- Coordinates: 44°27′33″N 15°27′25″E
- Country: Croatia
- County: Lika-Senj
- Municipality: Gospić

Area
  - Total: 83.8 km^{2} (32.4 sq mi)

Population (2021)
  - Total: 2
  - Density: 0.024/km^{2} (0.062/sq mi)
- Time zone: UTC+1 (CET)
  - Summer (DST): UTC+2 (CEST)

Počitelj is a village in the Gospić municipality in the Lika region of central Croatia, Lika-Senj County. It is located near Gospić, connected by the D25 highway. The 2011 census registered 4 residents.

== Demographics ==
Historical population 1857-2011
v

population	1340	1505	1432	1550	1674	1548	1594	1626	1153	1008	800	640	426	307	14	4
	1857	1869	1880	1890	1900	1910	1921	1931	1948	1953	1961	1971	1981	1991	2001	2011

Sources: Croatian Bureau of Statistics publications

== See also ==
- Operation Medak Pocket
