= Rahim Ademi =

Croatian general (born 1954)

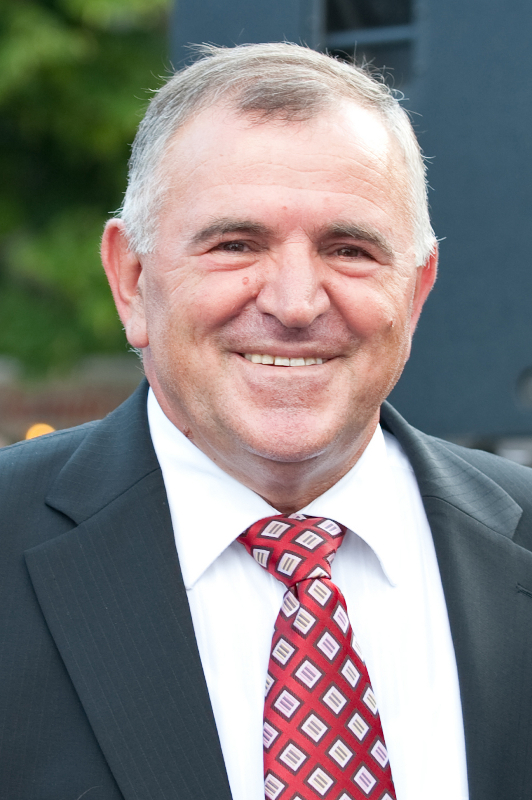
- Rahim Ademi in 2011
- Born: 30 January 1954 (age 72); Karače, Kosovo, FPR Yugoslavia
- Military career
- Allegiance: Yugoslavia; Croatia
- Branch: Yugoslav People's Army Croatian Army
- Rank: Brigadier general
- Conflicts: Croatian War of Independence: Battle of Šibenik; Operation Medak Pocket; Operation Storm
- Awards: Order of Duke Domagoj

Rahim Ademi (born 30 January 1954) is a retired Croatian Army general of Kosovar Albanian origin. He was one of the few Croatian generals prosecuted for war crimes against Serbian civilians during the Yugoslav Wars.

== Biography ==
Born and raised in the village of Karače, Vučitrn, Socialist Republic of Serbia, Socialist Federal Republic of Yugoslavia (modern day Kosovo), Ademi graduated from the Yugoslav Military Academy in Belgrade in 1976. He was assigned to a station in Rogoznica near Šibenik in Croatia where he married and had two children.

In 1986, the Military Court in Sarajevo convicted him of counterrevolutionary acts and Albanian irredentism, but after serving a year and a half in prison, the Supreme Military Court agreed with his appeal and acquitted him. He would spend the next years serving as an officer in Sinj until 1990 when the war in Croatia was starting and he deserted the Yugoslav People's Army in order to help create Croatian army formations.

He officially joined the Ministry of the Interior in 1991 and later became part of the Croatian Army forces during the Croatian War of Independence. Between 1992 and 1993, as a Brigadier, he commanded Croatian military units in the Sinj area, with particular responsibility for the Peruća Dam. In 1993 he was assigned to the post of sub commander of the Gospić military district, but was relieved of duty later that year, after the controversial Operation Medak pocket. He later served as a sub-commander of the Split military district and was promoted to brigadier general for his achievements in Operation Storm in 1995. He remained there until 1999 when he was reassigned to the post of the Assistant Chief Inspector of the Armed Forces in Zagreb.

During campaign for the 2014–15 presidential election, Ademi worked as a co-coordinator for Ivo Josipović.

=== War crime trial ===
During the Yugoslav Wars, Ademi was accused of committing war crimes against Serbian civilians. Canadian colonel J.O Michel Maisonneuve confronted Ademi, warning him that his forces engaging in ethnic cleansing was a contravention of international law.

In 2001, the International Criminal Tribunal for the Former Yugoslavia (ICTY) indicted Ademi for crimes against humanity allegedly committed against the Croatian Serbs in the Medak pocket. He was originally in the custody of the Court but was later allowed to prepare his defense free. In November 2005, in line with its completion strategy, the ICTY referred the Ademi-Norac case to the Croatian judiciary. The trial began on 18 June 2007 in front of a special bench of the Zagreb County Court with Judge Marin Mrčela presiding. He was transferred to Croatia, on 30 May 2008, Ademi was acquitted by the Zagreb County Court of responsibility for atrocities committed against Serb prisoners and civilians by Croat troops during Operation Medak Pocket. Ademi's acquittal has been criticized, largely due to the inability of the Croatian prosecutor to amend the indictment in order to include all forms of command responsibility, among other things. In addition, important witnesses refused to testify in the trial due to intimidations and threats.

Ademi claims that the Croatian government, under international pressure, relieved him of duty in Gospić in 1993 in order to make him a scapegoat, rather than implicating commanding officers Janko Bobetko, Mirko Norac and Mladen Markač. He alleged that the Tribunal wanted him for questioning as far back as 1998 but the government did not allow him to answer their questions.

In March 2010, the Supreme Court of Croatia upheld Ademi's acquittal.
