= Twelve Generals' Letter =

2000 letter by generals of the Croatian Armed Forces

The Twelve Generals' Letter (Croatian: Pismo dvanaestorice generala) was an open letter, signed by twelve generals of the Croatian Armed Forces, that criticized the government, politicians and media for perceived criminalization of the Croatian War of Independence and asserted that war veterans had suffered undignified treatment. On 29 September 2000, a day after the letter was published by the Croatian media, Croatian President Stjepan Mesić reacted by sending into forced retirement all seven of the signatories who were active-duty officers. The affair was a source of significant controversy in Croatia and is considered one of the key events in Mesić's ten-year presidential incumbency.

== Background ==
Croatia underwent major political changes in late 1999 – early 2000. The first President of Croatia and leader of the ruling Croatian Democratic Union (HDZ), Franjo Tuđman, died in office in December 1999. In January 2000 Tuđman's HDZ, a nationalist party that had ruled Croatia since independence in 1991, lost power in the parliamentary elections and was replaced by a center-left coalition of six parties. Stjepan Mesić, one of Tuđman's fiercest critics, won the presidential elections in the same month.

The new liberal and pro-European government began to investigate war crimes committed by Croatian forces in the Croatian War of Independence (1991–1995), aiming to improve cooperation with the International Criminal Tribunal for the former Yugoslavia (ICTY) in the Hague. These developments enraged the war veterans' groups and extreme nationalists.

After a key whistleblower and war crime witness Milan Levar was murdered on 28 August 2000, a wave of arrests of war crime suspects followed. In response, veterans' groups organized protests that escalated into threats and violence. An anonymous death threat was sent to President Mesić and Prime Minister Račan.

The new government also started a cycle of defense reforms, which aroused further concern among high-ranking officers of the Croatian Army who were themselves war veterans.

== Content ==
The letter was titled "An Open Letter of Croatian Generals to the Croatian Public" (Croatian: Otvoreno pismo hrvatskih generala hrvatskoj javnosti) and organized into six points.

The first point noted "with bitterness" that a significant proportion of media and politicians spoke of the Croatian War of Independence as "something bad, problematic, even shameful, while in fact it was the foundation of Croatia's freedom, independence and sovereignty".

The signatories stressed in the second point that they were not against the sanctioning of individual criminal acts. However, they asserted that recent actions by the police had left the impression of a crackdown on terrorism or organized crime, rather than an act of a democratic country within the rule of law, in accord with the actual circumstances and the dignity of war veterans and Croatian Army officers.

The third point denounced what the signatories called an "unnecessary show of force" and presumptions of guilt, including speculation about indictments by the ICTY, deeming them detrimental to tolerance and democracy in Croatia.

The fourth point rejected conflicts, violence and terrorism, which the signatories deemed to not be in the interests of "anyone responsible", war veterans in particular.

The fifth point comprised a comment by the signatories on speculation regarding the reorganisation of the Croatian Army. They declared their support for the promotion of the most educated and most capable individuals, "which means those who proved themselves in the Croatian War of Independence".

In the sixth and final point, the signatories urged the government, civil society and the media to "resist the negativist, historically incorrect and untrue portrayals of the Croatian War of Independence" and to "protect the dignity of Croatian officers and soldiers" as the foundations of Croatian freedom and independence, as well as the future of a democratic and prosperous Croatia.

The letter was signed by General of the Army (ret.) Janko Bobetko, Lt. Gen. Ante Gotovina, Lt. Gen. Krešimir Ćosić, Maj. Gen. Mirko Norac, Admiral Davor Domazet-Lošo, Maj. Gen. (ret.) Ivan Korade, Maj. Gen. Damir Krstičević, Lt. Gen. (ret.) Ivan Čermak, Maj. Gen. Ivan Kapular, Maj. Gen. (ret.) Nojko Marinović, Lt. Gen. (ret.) Ivan Basarac and Maj. Gen. Miljenko Filipović.

== Reactions ==
In his first public comment on the letter, Croatian President Stjepan Mesić noted that he also supported preserving the dignity of the Croatian War of Independence, provided "that the government is still functioning, that there is no selective approach, and that the law applies to everyone". He said that some individuals from the HDZ were responsible for the letter's creation.

The Office of the President of Croatia and the Croatian Ministry of Defense called the letter "inappropriate". The Ministry of Defence also described it as "unprofessional", noting that the law forbids the members of Croatian Armed Forces from engaging in political activities.

On 29 September 2000, a day after the letter was published, President Mesić announced that he was retiring all seven serving officers (Gotovina, Ćosić, Krstičević, Kapular, Filipović, Domazet-Lošo and Norac) who signed the letter. He stated that "those who thought a coup d'état in this country could be achieved with pamphlets have played the wrong card. As of today, they are not members of the Croatian Army."

Mesić's actions produced widely varied reactions from the political parties. The ruling coalition parties generally supported the move, calling it "logical", and even "necessary", while Ivo Sanader, president of the HDZ, criticized it as "extremely dangerous". Mesić was also severely criticised by Croatian war veterans' organisations. On the other hand, polls showed that the majority of Croatian public supported the President's actions.

An article by Nacional weekly warned that twenty more generals were planning to sign a letter against the government, which created concern about an actual coup. President Mesić, however, dismissed such speculations as "nonsense".

== Aftermath ==
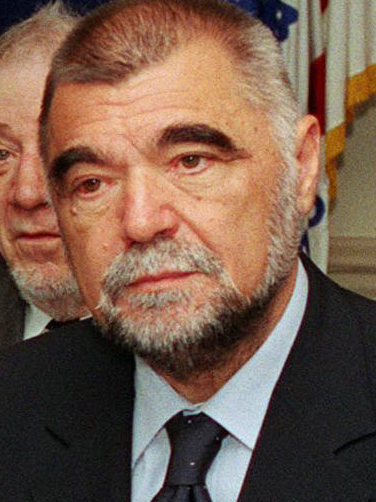
One year into his first term, Stjepan Mesić said that retiring the generals was one of the best moves he had made as a president.

On several occasions it was speculated that the retired generals might return to active duty. On 2 October 2000, President Mesić hinted that his decision might not yet be final for Maj. Gen. Krstičević, stating that Krstičević's fate depended on "his further conduct". At 33 years of age, he was the youngest among the signatories, and was – apart from Nojko Marinović – the only general from the Tuđman era with no party affiliation. Krstičević declined Mesić's implicit offer, saying that he had "nothing to repent for".

In the 2003 election campaign, Ivo Sanader, president of the HDZ, announced the possibility of reactivating the generals. However, according to Nacional weekly, Sanader abandoned the idea due to his inability to implement it against the wish of President Mesić, the Commander-in-Chief of the Armed Forces.

The issue was raised again in the 2009/2010 presidential election. Three presidential candidates, Milan Bandić, Andrija Hebrang and Nadan Vidošević, stated that, if elected, they would rehabilitate the generals and return some of them to active duty. The eventual winner of the election, Ivo Josipović, rejected this suggestion, saying that the generals' retirement was final.

Mesić's decision to retire the generals is widely seen as one of the most important events of his presidency. Stjepan Mesić's successor Ivo Josipović stated that this was Mesić's best move in both of his five-year terms, while Croatian military analyst Igor Tabak described it as a "hard decision to take", since it came early in the Mesić's first term, and went against an old authoritarian system that was still strong. The move is seen as important in the context of the depoliticisation of the armed forces and defence reforms that ultimately led to the accession of Croatia to NATO in 2009. On the other hand, Mesić's critics contend that the supposed "coup" was non-existent and that his decision was essentially a continuation of anti-military sentiment which the generals had to publicly address as their patriotic duty.
