= Medak, Croatia =

Village in Lika-Senj, Croatia

Medak
- Village
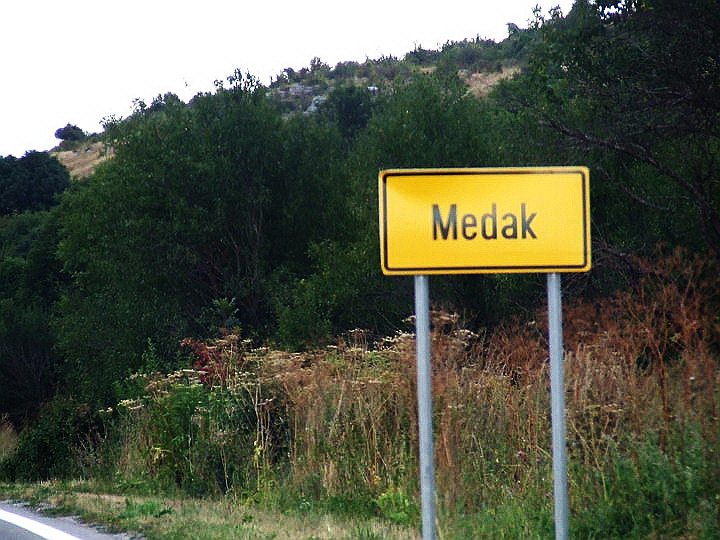
- Entrance to Medak

- Location within Croatia
- Coordinates: 44°27′20″N 15°30′29″E
- Country: Croatia
- Region: Lika
- County: Lika-Senj
- Town: Gospić

Area
  - Total: 32.8 km^{2} (12.7 sq mi)
- Elevation: 574 m (1,883 ft)

Population (2021)
  - Total: 36
  - Density: 1.1/km^{2} (2.8/sq mi)
- Time zone: UTC+1 (CET)
  - Summer (DST): UTC+2 (CEST)
- Postal code: 53205
- Area code: 053

Medak is a village in the Lika-Senj County, Croatia. The settlement is administered as a part of the city of Gospić.

In 1993, Medak was the site of Operation Medak Pocket.

== Demographics ==
According to national census of 2011, population of the settlement is 62. This represents 11.01% of its pre-war population according to the 1991 census.

The 1991 census recorded that 94.32% of the village population were ethnic Serbs (531/563), 0.71% were Croats (4/563), 0.53% were Yugoslavs (3/563) while 4.44% were of other ethnic origin (25/563).

Historical population 1857–2011
v

population	1166	1242	1215	1390	1485	1424	1364	1466	1052	1042	1003	848	663	563	78	62
	1857	1869	1880	1890	1900	1910	1921	1931	1948	1953	1961	1971	1981	1991	2001	2011

Sources: Croatian Bureau of Statistics publications

== Notable people ==
- Nikola Kleut
- Dušan Vuksan
