= 1st Guards Brigade (Croatia) =

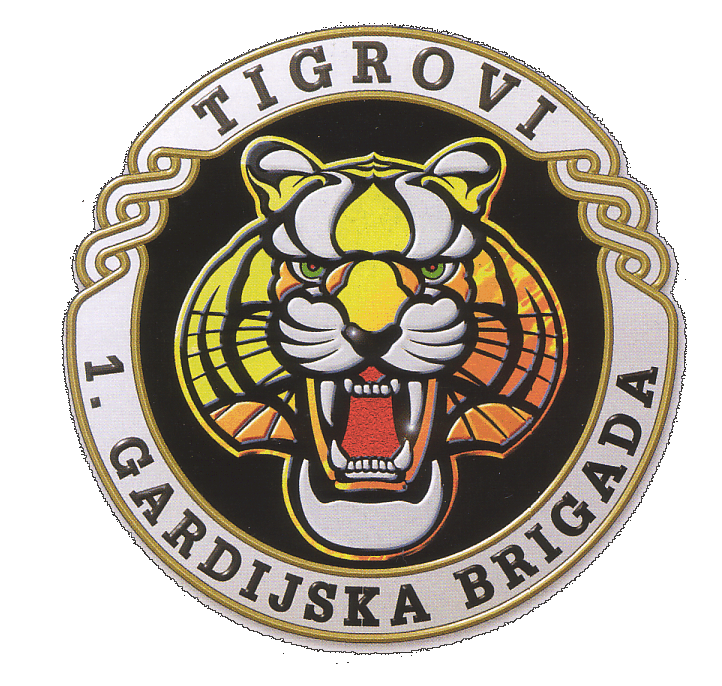
- 1st Guard logo
- Active: 1990–2008
- Country: Croatia
- Branch: Army
- Type: Mechanized Infantry
- Size: Brigade
- Garrison/HQ: Karlovac
- Nickname: Tigrovi (The Tigers)
- Motto: "Za Hrvatsku kao Tigar!" ("For Croatia like a Tiger!")
- Engagements: Croatian War of Independence: Siege of Dubrovnik; Operation Maslenica; Operation Flash; Operation Storm; Operation Una; Other operations; Bosnian War: Operation Summer '95; Other operations

Commanders
- Notable commanders: General Josip Lucić; Major General Marijan Mareković; Brigadier Drago Horvat

The 1st Mechanized Guard Brigade (Croatian: Prva mehanizirana gardijska brigada), nicknamed "the Tigers" (Croatian: Tigrovi), was the most elite and best equipped military brigade of the Croatian Army. Its military base and headquarters was in the Croatian capital of Zagreb, origin of most of the brigade's personnel. In 2008, as part of a larger military restructuring, the brigade-sized unit was disbanded and reformed as a battalion of the Motorized Guard Brigade.

== Formation ==
It was initially formed on November 5, 1990, at the military base in Rakitje. It was formed from volunteers and elements of the Croatian Police (which was to form the basis for the new Croatian army). Initially, lack of equipment forced the unit to be a wholly Infantry brigade, but this was soon corrected and the unit became a Motorized Infantry brigade by September 1991, when major military operations in the war begun.

It was the part of the Croatian National Guard, the predecessor of the Croatian Army, and was initially referred to as the 1st "A" Brigade.

== Military service ==
=== Vukovar ===
When the war begun, the 1st Brigade was directed to eastern Slavonia, an area of Croatia which was under heaviest attack. The battle of Vukovar, pivotal battle of the first phase of the war, was where elements of brigade first saw combat service. As the city was under heavy attack by a large number of tank and mechanized units of the Yugoslav People's Army (JNA), it was soon surrounded and besieged. Small elements of the 1st Guard Brigade remained inside the city, but the majority of the brigade was outside and continued to hold the front against overwhelming enemy strength. The city would eventually fall, but some of the entrapped defenders managed a breakout.

As the Battle of the Barracks came to an end in late September, and Croats captured number of heavy equipment from JNA barracks, the 1st Guard Brigade was equipped with tanks (gaining the first 12 tanks in September after the fall of the Varaždin barracks) and armoured personnel carriers (APCs) and the first tank battalion was formed. By the end of 1992, the Brigade was redesignated 1st Mechanized Guard Brigade.

=== 1992–1994 ===
In mid-1992, the brigade was directed to end the blockade of the besieged city of Dubrovnik. The result was that the furthest south region of Croatia completely liberated by the end of the year.

Elements of the brigade were involved in Operation Maslenica during 1993.

During 1994, Croatian army was mostly inactive and the period was spent in training and refitting.

=== Final operations ===
Status and equipment of the brigade meant that it was always used in the worst fighting. Once the Croatian Army went from defensive to offensive strategy in 1993, the army doctrine was based on a variation of blitzkrieg strategy in which weaker units would hold lines and Guard brigades - like the Tigers - would be used as line breakers to penetrate defenses, then isolate and destroy enemy formations. This tactics was used with great success during 1995.

In May 1995, during Operation Flash, 1st Guard brigade led one of two main attacks that fragmented and destroyed Serb forces in Western Slavonia.

The brigade participated in Operation Summer 1995 in Bosnia and was instrumental in capturing mountainous terrain east of rebel Republic of Serbian Krajina which was to be pivotal for the following operation.

For Operation Storm, the brigade was deployed along the west sector (north of Gospić) and was the main strike element responsible with reaching the border with Bosnia and Herzegovina on that line. The brigade captured Plitvice (where the first casualties of the war fell in 1991's Plitvice Lakes incident) and reached the border, linking up with the elements of the Army of the Republic of Bosnia and Herzegovina (ARBiH) - one of the aims of the operation was the deblocking of the Bihać pocket where the ARBiH’s Fifth Corps was besieged. Upon reaching the border, the brigade - with ARBiH forces - advanced north.

After Storm, Croatian and Bosnian forces were on a general counteroffensive and the 1st Brigade was one of the units send to Bosnia for the purpose, where it successfully participated in liberating western Bosnia, occupied by rebel Serb forces since 1992. The combination of successful counteroffensive and NATO bombardment (Operation Deliberate Force) forced rebel Serbs to agree to peace negotiations.

During the entire war, 364 members of the brigade were killed on duty, 1711 were wounded, and 8 are still missing in action.

== Post-war ==
Following the Dayton Agreement, Croatia scaled down its military forces to reflect the end of the war. Despite this, and due to the brigades elite status and treatment, it retained the status of one of the most effective elements of the Croatian armed forces.

It was the first Croatian brigade to be reorganized and adopted to NATO standards.

== Engagement in Afghanistan ==
Elements of the brigade were sent to Afghanistan following the 2001 war in Afghanistan as part of NATO's efforts there. The Croatian units in Afghanistan included mainly Military Police units (elements of 1st and 2nd Guard Brigades) as part of the mission to train Afghanistan's new armed forces. Some parts of the Croatian military mission there may be dispatched to more dangerous areas of the country.

== 2007 Armed forces reform ==
During the reform of Croatian Armed Forces in 2007–2008, the brigade was reorganized to battalion level and incorporated in new Motorized Guard Brigade as 1st Mechanized Battalion Tigers.
