= Široka Kula massacre =

1991 killing of 41 civilians in Croatia

Coordinates: 44°36′55″N 15°27′24″E

- Part of the Croatian War of Independence
- Široka Kula on the map of Croatia. Serb-held territories in late December 1991 are highlighted in red.
- Location: Široka Kula, near Gospić, Croatia
- Date: 13–21 October 1991
- Target: Croat civilians and some Serbs suspected of assisting Croatian authorities
- Attack type: Summary executions, ethnic cleansing
- Deaths: 41
- Perpetrator: SAO Krajina police

The Široka Kula massacre was the killing of 41 civilians in the village of Široka Kula near Gospić, Croatia during the Croatian War of Independence. The killings began on 13 October 1991 and continued until late October. They were perpetrated by the Croatian Serb SAO Krajina police and generally targeted ethnic Croat civilians in Široka Kula. Several victims were ethnic Serbs suspected by the police of collaboration with Croatian authorities. Most of the victims' bodies were thrown into the Golubnjača Pit, a nearby karst cave.

Thirteen individuals were charged and tried in connection with the killings, four were convicted in absentia in Belgrade. The other eleven were tried and convicted in absentia in Gospić. One of those convicted by Gospić County Court subsequently returned to Croatia, where he was granted a retrial and acquitted. A monument dedicated to the victims of the massacre was built in the village in 2003.

== Background ==
In August 1990, an insurrection took place in Croatia centred on the predominantly Serb-populated areas, including parts of Lika, around the city of Gospić, with significant Serb populations. The areas were subsequently named SAO Krajina and, after declaring its intention to integrate with Serbia, the Government of Croatia declared it to be a rebellion. By March 1991, the conflict escalated into the Croatian War of Independence. In June 1991, Croatia declared its independence as Yugoslavia disintegrated. A three-month moratorium followed, after which the decision came into effect on 8 October.

As the Yugoslav People's Army (JNA) increasingly supported the SAO Krajina, the Croatian Police were unable to cope. Thus, the Croatian National Guard (ZNG) was formed in May 1991. The development of the military of Croatia was hampered by a UN arms embargo introduced in September, while the military conflict in Croatia continued to escalate—the Battle of Vukovar started on 26 August. By the end of August the fighting intensified in Lika as well, specifically as the Battle of Gospić continued through much of September.

== Killings ==
SAO Krajina forces occupied the village of Široka Kula in September 1991. The village was located 11 kilometres (6.8 miles) northeast of Gospić in Lika. It had an ethnically mixed prewar population of 536 consisting of Croats and Serbs, but most of the Croat population fled by the end of the month.

On 13 October, the chief of the SAO Krajina police in Široka Kula instructed the remaining Croats in the village to move to two houses before they were evacuated. After the civilians complied with the request, SAO Krajina forces shot at the assembled villagers, while houses owned by Croats were looted and torched by a mob. The attack resulted in thirteen civilian deaths. The victims were killed using shotguns and their bodies thrown into burning houses. Some of the victims were burned to death. Most of those killed were elderly, and at least two of the victims were children (13 and 17 years of age). In the following days, the killings continued. According to a 2013 news report, a total of 41 civilians were killed in the village that month, and most of the corpses thrown into the Golubnjača Pit, 22 of which were retrieved from the karst cave as of 2011. In November 1992, Republic of Serbian Krajina (RSK) police estimated that the bodies of approximately forty Croat civilians were thrown into the pit.

In mid-October, SAO Krajina police arrested four Serbian civilians in Široka Kula, Mane Rakić and his three children for allegedly collaborating with Croatian authorities. During the night of 20/21 October, the police searched Rakić's home, and then killed his wife in another house in Široka Kula. Her body was doused with kerosene and torched. By the end of the month, Rakić and his children were also murdered and their remains thrown into the Golubnjača Pit.

== Aftermath ==
Five SAO Krajina police officers were prosecuted by Knin District Court in 1992 for the murder of the Rakić family. The investigation was spurred on by requests from relatives of the victims, who threatened the RSK authorities that they would notify the United Nations Protection Force (UNPROFOR) unless the RSK authorities continued searching, which led Đuro Kresović, president of Knin District Court to write to the Minister of the Interior of the RSK asking for instructions on how to proceed, stating that any attempt to retrieve the bodies of the Rakić family would uncover numerous other bodies in the Golubnjača Pit. He requested instructions on how to proceed with the investigation and what to do if the UNPROFOR found out about the bodies in the pit. Even though the RSK investigation was completed, trial of those suspected of involvement in the murders did not begin before 2010 in Belgrade. The trial and the appeals process were concluded in 2013, resulting in four convictions: Čedo Budisavljević was sentenced to thirteen years in prison, while Mirko Malinović, Milan Bogunović and Bogdan Gruičić were sentenced to twelve, ten, and eight years in prison respectively.

In 1994, the County Court in Gospić tried and convicted in absentia a group of seven Croatian Serbs for their involvement in the killings of eight civilians (members of the Nikšić and Orešković families, but not the Rakić family) in Široka Kula, handing out prison sentences. Nikola Zagorac, Miroslav Serdar and Dragan Vunjak were sentenced to 20 years in prison each, while Dane Serdar, Dušan Uzelac, Milorad Barać and Dragan Uzelac each received sentences of 15 years in prison. In 1997, the County Court in Gospić also tried Vladimir Korica and Branko Banjeglav in absentia for taking part in the massacre. Both of them were convicted and sentenced to 12 years in prison. None of those convicted in absentia served any prison time. Dane Serdar voluntarily returned to Croatia in September 2003 and was granted a retrial as he had been convicted in absentia. Dane Serdar's 1994 conviction was overturned and he was acquitted in September 2004, after prosecution failed to present sufficient evidence against him.

A monument to the victims of the massacre, as well as 164 World War II victims from the area of Široka Kula, was built in 2003. The monument, designed by Petar Dolić and named the Croatian History Portal (Portal hrvatske povijesti), was unveiled by the relatives of those killed in the 1991 massacre on 13 October, marking the 12th anniversary of the killings.
