= Lički Čitluk =

- Village
- Location of Lički Čitluk in Croatia
- Coordinates: 44°28′26″N 15°24′11″E
- Country: Croatia
- County: Lika-Senj
- Municipality: Gospić

Area
  - Total: 29.8 km^{2} (11.5 sq mi)

Population (2021)
  - Total: 5
  - Density: 0.17/km^{2} (0.43/sq mi)
- Time zone: UTC+1 (CET)
  - Summer (DST): UTC+2 (CEST)

Lički Čitluk is a village in the Gospić municipality in the Lika region of central Croatia, Lika-Senj County. It is located near Gospić, connected by the D25 highway. The 2011 census registered 4 residents.

== Demographics ==
Historical population 1857-2011
v

population	434	505	486	478	673	627	603	570	344	322	279	236	149	129	5	4
	1857	1869	1880	1890	1900	1910	1921	1931	1948	1953	1961	1971	1981	1991	2001	2011

Sources: Croatian Bureau of Statistics publications
