= Mirko Norac =

Croatian general and convicted war criminal

Mirko Norac Kevo
- Born: September 19, 1967 (age 59); Otok, SR Croatia, SFR Yugoslavia
- Spouse: Jelena Norac Kevo
- Military career
- Allegiance: Croatia
- Branch: Croatian Army
- Service years: 1990–2000

Mirko Norac (born 19 September 1967) is a former Croatian general of the Croatian Army (HV). He was the war hero, but he also was first Croatian Army general to be found guilty of war crimes by a Croatian court, in 2003, after his case was transferred from The Hague to Zagreb. He was released on probation in November 2011.

== Military service ==
Mirko Norac (also known as Mirko Norac Kevo) was born in the village of Otok, Socialist Federal Republic of Yugoslavia, now part of the Republic of Croatia. He attended school in Sinj. Soon after the first multi-party elections in Croatia in August 1990, he joined the Ministry of Interior. On 12 September 1990 he joined the Lučko Anti-Terrorist Unit, a unit of the Croatian police. As a member of the Lučko Anti-Terrorist Unit, he took part in early activities by the Croatian police forces including the Plitvice Lakes incident.

=== Gospić Operations ===
Location of Gospić in Croatia

In September 1991, Norac left the police force and moved to Gospić, where he took part in the assault against local Serbs and Yugoslav People's Army (JNA) units. The town was surrounded from 3 sides. The JNA barracks, the Stanko Opsenica (with around 70 officers and 200 soldiers, plus numerous Serbian paramilitaries) were all trapped inside. After four days of siege, led by Norac, the JNA surrendered the barracks.

In mid-September 1991, Norac was appointed commander of the 118th Brigade of the Croatian Army. One month later he took part in event known as the Gospić massacre when between 100 and 120 local Serbs were murdered by men under his command. Norac became the youngest colonel of the Croatian Army, and was appointed commander of the 118th Brigade of the Croatian Army.

=== Maslenica and Medak ===
In November 1992, Norac was named the commander of the 6th Guards Brigade which was soon renamed to the 9th Guards Motorised Brigade. In 1992, Croatian president and commander-in-chief Franjo Tuđman ordered his relief due to ever increasing rumours of war crimes committed against civilians under his command. Norac disobeyed his order and responded back to Croatian president that: "the only general whom he knows is Vjekoslav Maks Luburić". According to Croatian news site Šibenski, he remained in command thanks to the influence of powerful minister Gojko Šušak. He took part in Operation Maslenica in early 1993. He went on to command Operation Medak Pocket, during which time war crimes against the local ethnic Serb population were committed. In the operation Norac was wounded in both hands and legs by an unexploded land mine. One Croatian officer described Norac at a time as: "young, arrogant, courageous but also self-willing".

He spent a month in a Zagreb hospital, then returned to Gospić. In 1994, he was promoted to brigadier and appointed commander of the Gospić Operational Zone. That same year he was named the annual voivode ("Duke of Alka") in the Alkarsko društvo celebration. The Mayor of Zagreb, Milan Bandić, and other top Croatian officials attended the event.

=== Operation Storm and after ===
Norac took part in Operation Storm in August 1995. On 25 September 1995, he was promoted to the rank of Major General. On 15 March 1996, Norac was appointed commander of the Knin Corps District. The President of Croatia, Stjepan Mesić, discharged Norac from the Croatian Army on 29 September 2000, after he had co-signed the so-called Twelve Generals' Letter against what was claimed to be "criminalization" of the Croatian War of Independence.

== War crimes ==
=== Gospić killings ===
On 16 October 1991, Tihomir Orešković (Secretary of Lika Crisis Headquarters) called a meeting to organise the killing of ethnic Serb civilians in the area. During that meeting a list of local Serbs to be murdered was formulated. Norac reportedly attended the meeting, among a group of masked and unmasked soldiers and civil policemen, which later raided houses in Gospić and took custody of ethnic Serb civilians, informing them that they were to be interrogated. He organised and directed the executions of the civilians in a desolate area near the town, executing one woman himself. Those murdered included Radmila Stanić, Branko Kuzmanović, Branko Štulić, Stanko Smiljanić, Radojka Diklić, Mirjana Kalanj, Đorđe Kalanj, Dane Bulj, Milan Pantelić, Mileva Orlović, Miloš Orlović, Radovan Barać, Ljubica Trifunović, Petar Lazić, Borka Vraneš, Bogdan Šuput, Dušanka Vraneš, Nikola Gajić and Željko Mrkić.

On 8 February 2001, an arrest warrant for Norac (then living in Zagreb) was issued by the Ministry of Interior. The fugitive asked the Zagreb police if he could turn himself in at Rijeka, to avoid the media. He was allowed to do so but used the opportunity to escape. Sixteen days later (on 22 February) he turned himself in, denying all charges. On 5 March 2001, an indictment against Norac, Orešković, Stjepan Grandić, Ivica Rožić and Milan Canić was issued, accusing them of the murder of 50 civilians at Karlobag, Pazarište and Lipova glavica.

The trial at Rijeka County Court lasted for 14 months and over 150 witnesses testified, including Croatian soldiers and civilians. On 24 March 2003, Norac was found guilty and sentenced to 12 years in prison. Orešković and Grandić were sentenced to 15 and 10 years, and Rožić and Canić were acquitted of all charges due to lack of evidence. Norac served his sentence in Glina, where he was allowed, on at least one occasion, to go home for a weekend to visit family in Sinj. He was released on probation in November 2011, after serving no more than eight years.

=== Operation Medak Pocket ===
On 20 May 2004, the International Criminal Tribunal for the former Yugoslavia (ICTY) issued an indictment against Norac (and Rahim Ademi and Janko Bobetko) for crimes committed during Operation Medak pocket in 1993. The indictment stated that as a result of the Croatian military operation: "... the Medak Pocket became uninhabitable. The villages of the Pocket were completely destroyed, thereby depriving the Serbian civilian population of their homes and livelihood." Norac was accused of having "planned, instigated, ordered, committed or otherwise aided and abetted in the planning, preparation or execution of persecutions of Serb civilians of the Medak Pocket on racial, political or religious grounds", and of the "mutilation and desecration of the body of Boja Pjevać; the public killing of Boja Vujnović by burning her alive".

On 8 July 2004, Norac was transferred to an ICTY courtroom in The Hague where he pleaded not guilty to all five charges brought against him. The judge ruled that he did not have to remain in the ICTY prison and could be returned to prison in Croatia. On 14 September 2005, the ICTY decided to transfer the case to Croatian jurisdiction as the first ICTY case to be transferred to a local court. (Bobetko had died in the interim.) The trials of Norac and Ademi began at Zagreb County Court in June 2007 and ended on 30 May 2008. Norac was found guilty of failing to stop soldiers under his command from killing and torturing Serbs, and was sentenced to an additional seven years concurrent imprisonment.

== Lawsuit ==
The Croatian state attorney's office launched a case on 17 December 2013, aiming to force Norac to pay 111,000 euros, the amount awarded in damages to relatives of victims in two separate wartime incidents.

== Family ==
Norac married Jelena Midenjak, a dentist. The couple have at least two children.
