= Dom i sviet =

Croatian literary and news magazine

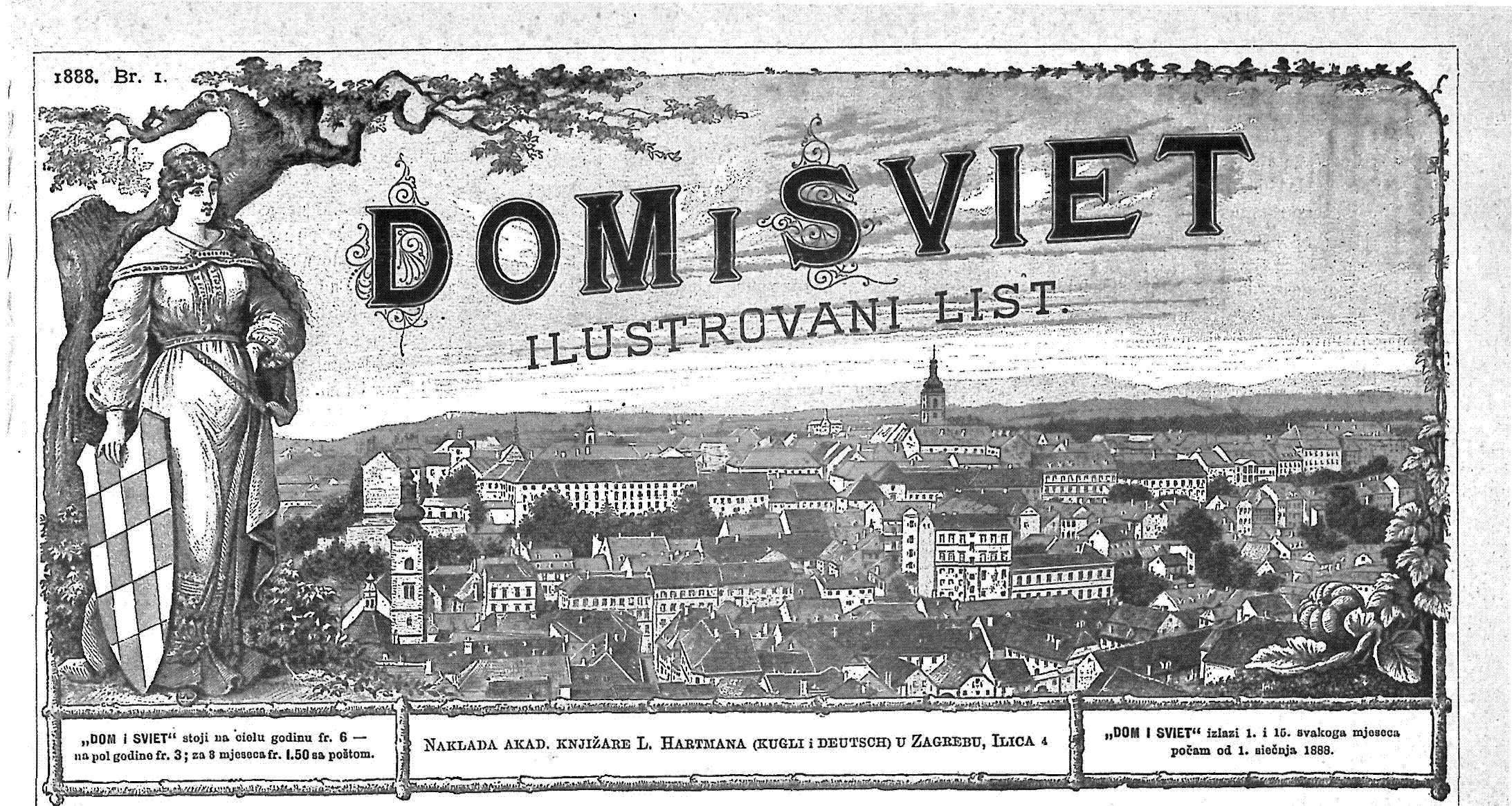
- May 1888 cover
- Editor: Nikola Kokotović
- Frequency: bi-weekly
- First issue: May 1888; 138 years ago
- Final issue: 1923; 103 years ago
- Country: Austria-Hungary; Kingdom of Yugoslavia
- Language: Croatian
- ISSN: 1849-2797

Dom i sviet (lit. 'Home and World') was a literary and news magazine published once every two weeks between May 1888 and 1923 in Zagreb. The publication's full title was Dom i sviet. Ilustrovani list za zabavu, pouku i viesti (lit. 'Home and World. Illustrated Paper for Entertainment, Education and News'). The magazine was edited by Nikola Kokotović and its contributors included August Harambašić, Vladimir Fran Mažuranić, Silvije Strahimir Kranjčević, Eugen Kumičić, Ante Tresić Pavičić, and Vjenceslav Novak.

== Sources ==
- "Dom i sviet". Croatian Encyclopedia (in Croatian). Zagreb: Miroslav Krleža Institute of Lexicography. 2013–2026.
