= Grabovača =

Cave Park Grabovača
- Pećinski park Grabovača (Croatian)
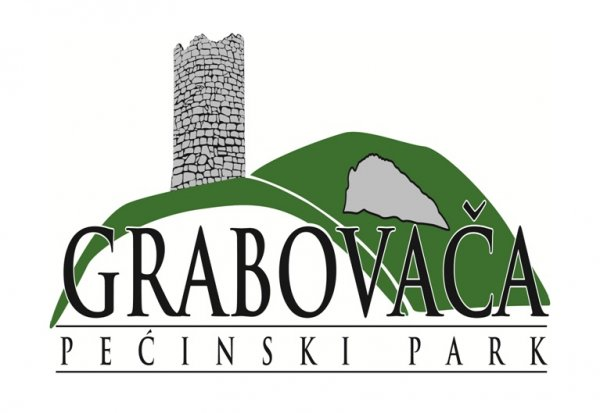

- Location within Croatia
- Location: Lika-Senj County, Croatia

History
- Established: 2006

Protected Natural Value of Croatia

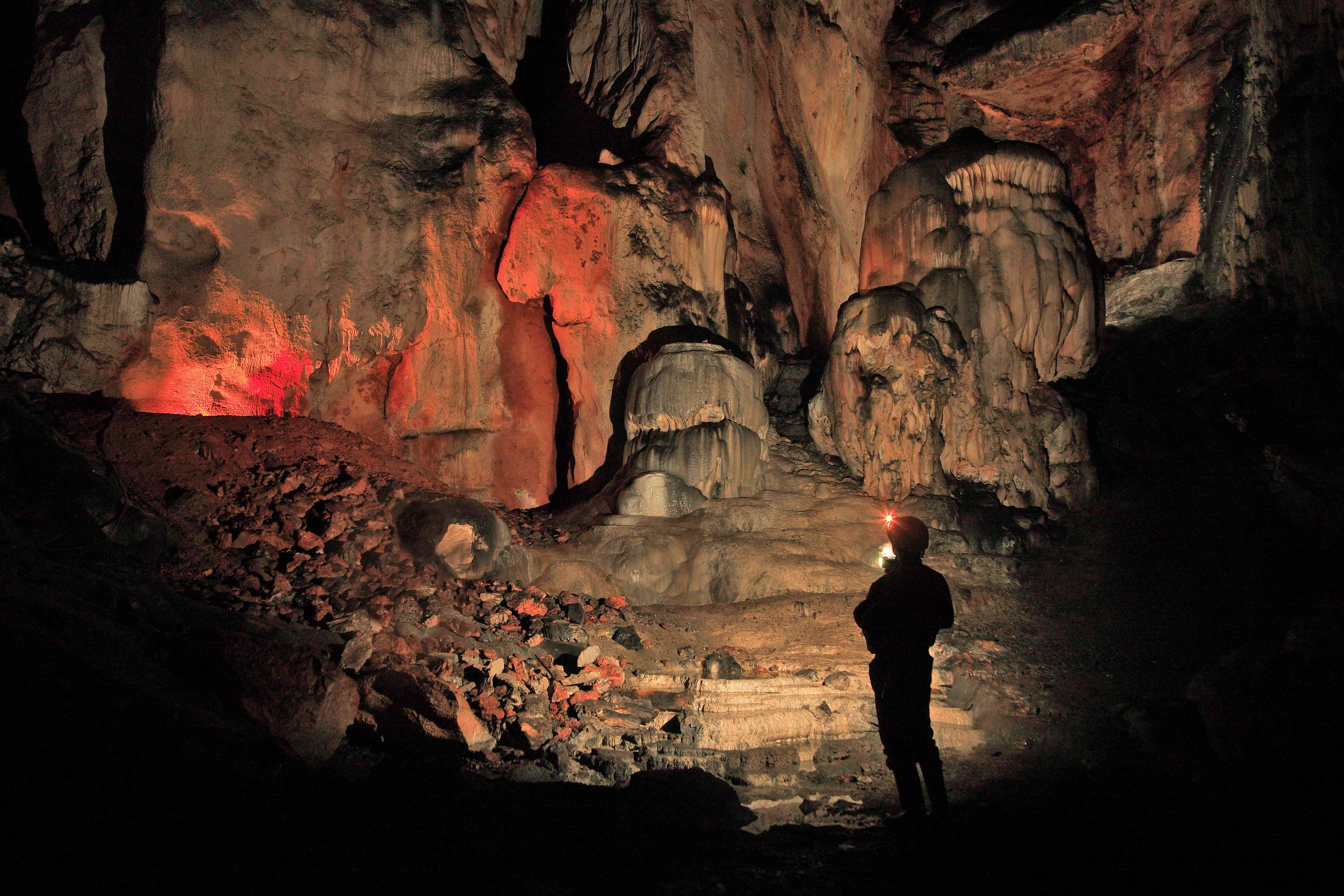
Cave Samograd in Grabovača

Grabovača is a cave park located in Perušić, Croatia.

It is the elevation of the mid-Velebit, which is situated between the Lika karst plains and fields in Perusic, 2 km from the center of Perušić. It is located at 770 m above sea level near the karst basin of the river Lika. With it on the west and south shoots wide panorama of the vast karst plateau with Lika River canyon, an artificial lake breads and green wall on the far horizon of Velebit.

On the east side, historical monuments tower from the late 17th-century parish church, from the late 17th the century. On Grabovaca there is many underground karst forms, which make up a quarter of the total number of protected cave facilities in Croatia. The complex variety and abundance of calcite formations valuable speleological phenomena (six cave and a cave) is located at spatially restricted sites of only 1.5 km^{2} (0.58 sq mi). The park features eight caves and a pit, all which feature calcite formations.

The park is protected and managed locally. The caves are available to be seen in all the seasons except winter.

The Grabovača cave is planning to connect to the existing lighting electricity as a source of power even in the current year, and the obtaining of financial assets and replace with a new lighting system that would be adapted to environmental standards in a way that the minimum extent color temperature lighting effect the existing microclimate of the cave.

There are 24 fully or partially explored caves. Five caves are protected as geomorphological natural monuments: Samograd, Medina cave, Amidžina cave (1964), Budina ice cave and Petrićeva cave (1970). Caves Budina and Samogradić are sites protected under the EU eco network Natura 2000.

== Cave Samograd ==
Length is 345,8 m (1134 ft). It consists of several chambers: Frass chamber (named after travel writer), Perušića chamber (honoring the lords of Perušić), Karlovića chamber (honoring the Croatian count) and Kukuljevića chamber (named after Ivan Kukuljević). Human bones and pottery found inside the cave date from 12th to 1st century BC. The signatures of Austrian officers date from 1835. In 1886 Samograd Cave Development Committee (Croatian: Odbor za uređenje špilje Samograd) was established, the first association related to caves in Croatia. It was illuminated in 1890. Trails and stairs were first constructed in 1903, for a planned visit of count Khuen Hedervary to Lika region. The first plan of Samograd was made in 1911, making it the first plan of a tourist cave in Croatia.

== See also ==
- List of Dinaric caves
