= Kosinj Bridge =

Coordinates: 44°44′06″N 15°16′26″E

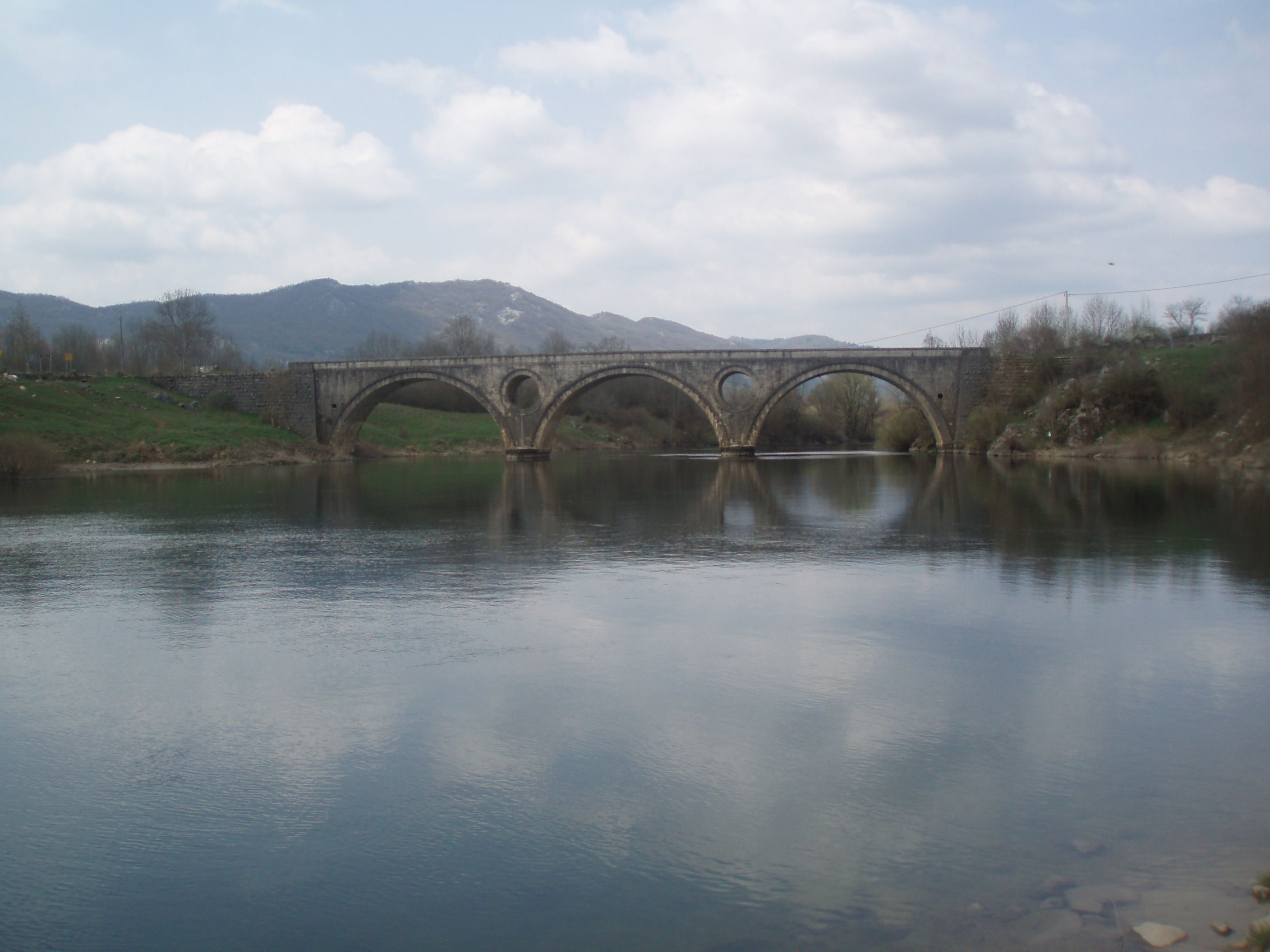
Kosinj Bridge

Kosinj Bridge (Croatian: Kosinjski most) is a 70-metre (230 ft) stone bridge in Kosinj region in Lika, Croatia. It connects the villages Gornji Kosinj and Donji Kosinj. It was designed in the 20th century by Milivoj Frković, and was modelled on the old Croatian bridge-building technique of stone clipping. The bridge features piers designed to reduce or eliminate scour damage. Not only does this design help relieve the impact of waves on the bride, but it creates symmetrical circles in the water.

The construction of the bridge began in 1929. In 1936, it was opened to traffic. The length of the bridge is 70 metres (230 ft), including abutments, with 5.5 metres (18 ft) between the stone parapets.
