= Lavoslav Vukelić =

Croatian poet and translator

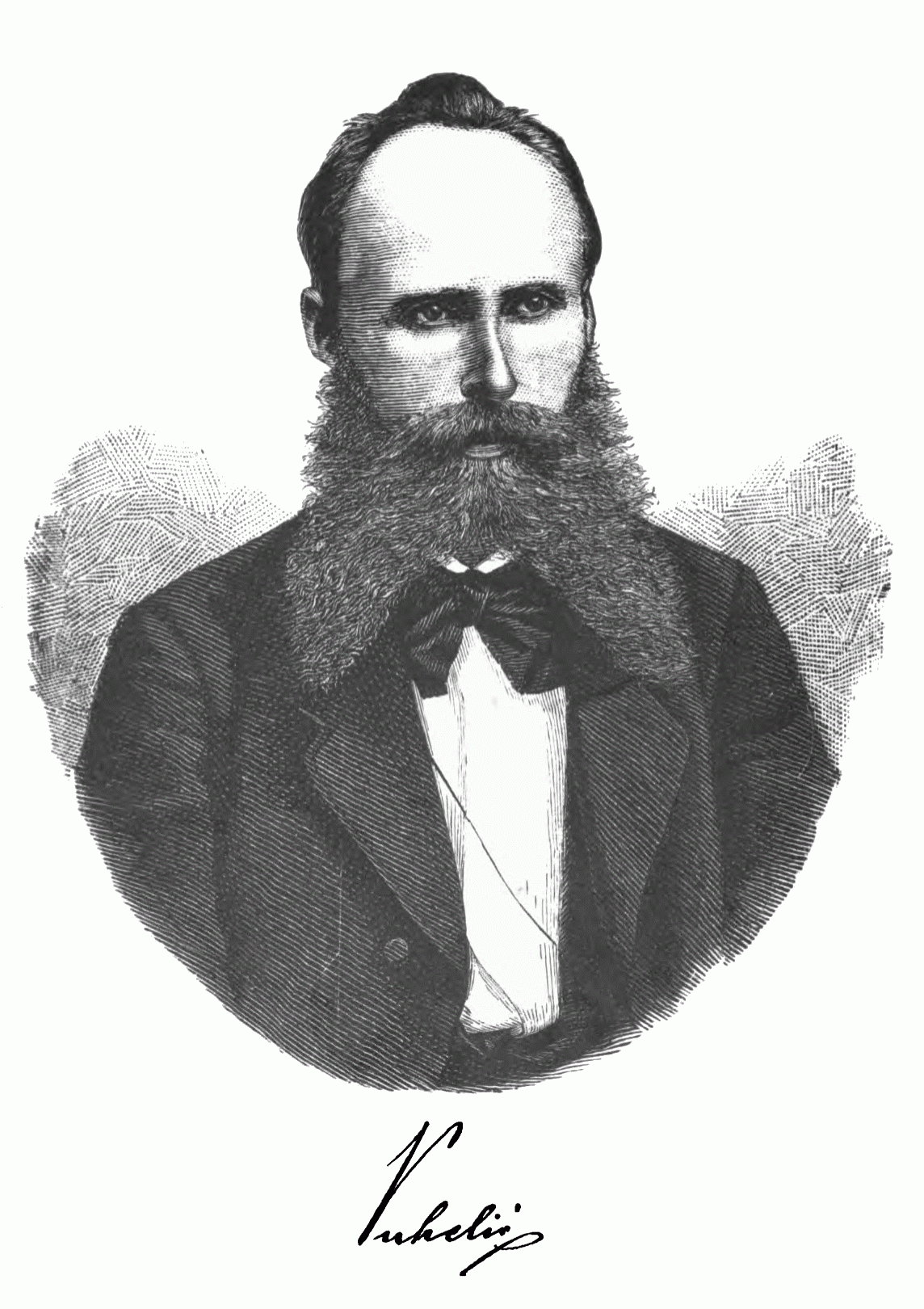
- Born: March 20, 1840; Gornji Kosinj, Kingdom of Croatia, Austrian Empire (now Gornji Kosinj, Croatia)
- Died: March 26, 1879 (aged 39); Sveti Križ Začretje, Kingdom of Croatia-Slavonia, Austria-Hungary (now Sveti Križ Začretje, Croatia)
- Occupations: poet, translator

Lavoslav Vukelić (Croatian pronunciation: [lâʋoslaʋ ʋǔkelit͡ɕ]; 20 March 1840 — 26 March 1879) was a Croatian translator and poet.

== Biography ==
Lavoslav Vukelić was born into the noble family Vukelić whose ancestors had long ago moved to Lika from Dalmatia with many others and converted to Roman Catholicism. Vukelić completed his elementary and secondary school in Senj.

Then he went to Vienna to pursue a management course on a stipend from the Military Frontier authorities. After that, he returned to Lika, where he served as an officer in many places. In his senior years, he was transferred to Sveti Križ Začretje as an officer. There he appointed prefect secretary.

== Work ==
He is an author of 79 songs which were collected by Bude Budisavljević in a booklet entitled Literary Flowers (Croatian: Književno cvieće). Also, he translated works by English, German, Polish, Russian, Italian, and Slovenian authors. The most important are his translations of Shakespeare, Goethe, Gottfried August Bürger, Heine, Mickiewicz, Lermontov, and Pushkin.

== Selected works ==
- Literary Glossary of Lavoslav Vukelić, Zagreb, 1882 (Bude Budisavljević);
- Literary Flower / Lavoslav Vukelić, collected (Buda Budisavljević, Zagreb, 1884)
- Selected Works / Franjo Marković, Lavoslav Vukelić, Andrija Palmović, Rikard Jorgovanić, Five Centuries of Croatian Literature, Vol. 44, Zagreb, 1970 (compiled by Nedjeljko Mihanovic)

== See also ==
- Petar Preradović
- August Harambašić
- Ognjeslav Utješenović
- Dimitrija Demeter
