= Perušić =

- Municipality
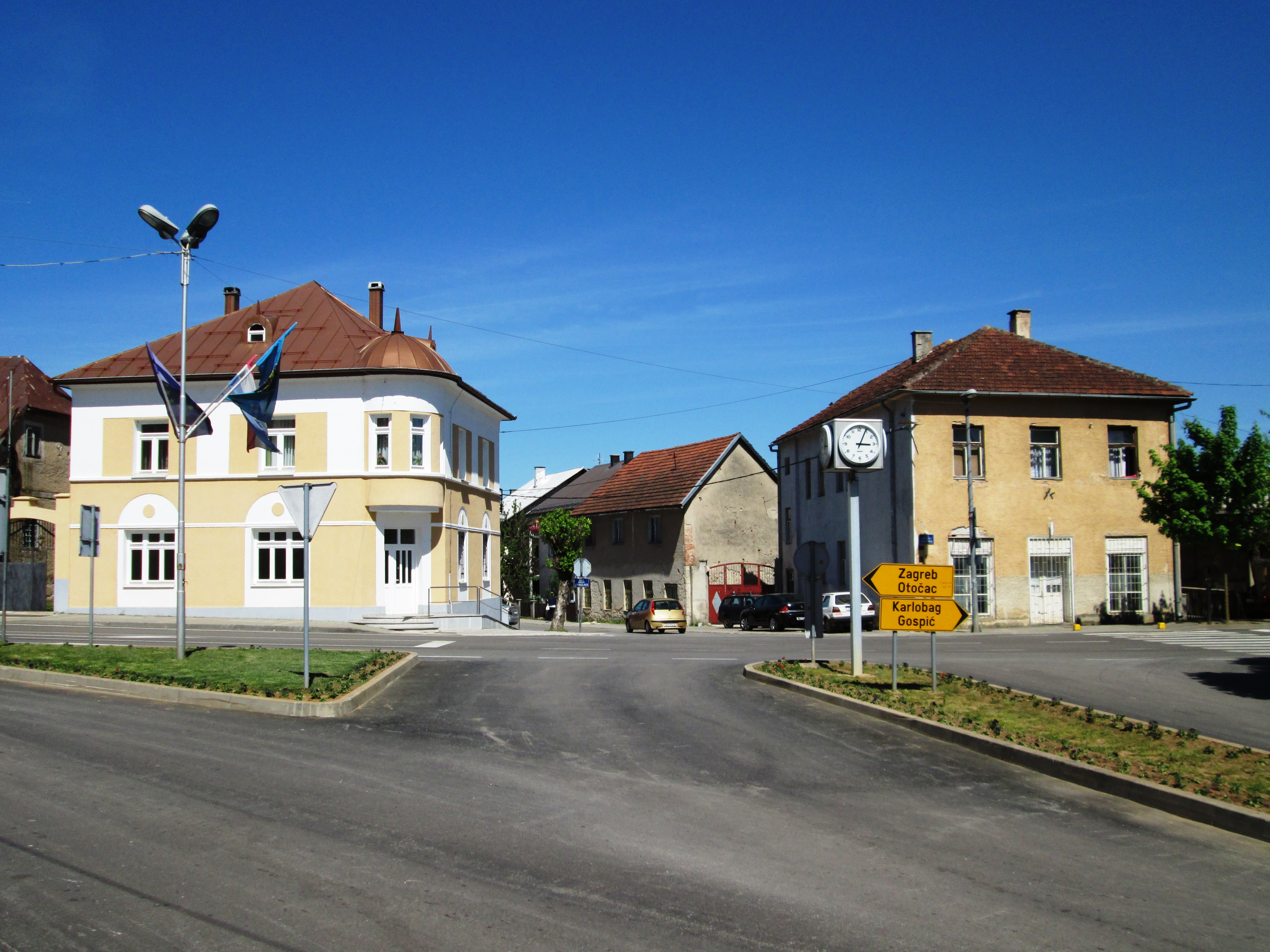
- Town center

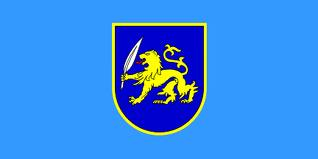
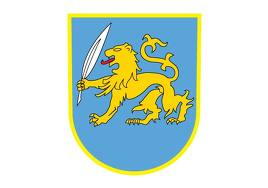
- Flag Seal

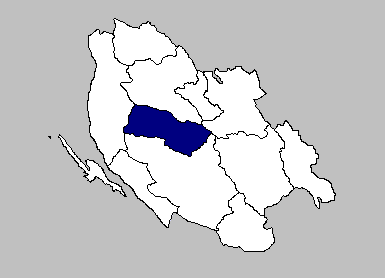
- The Municipality of Perušić within Lika-Senj County.
- Interactive map of Perušić
- Coordinates: 44°39′N 15°23′E
- Country: Croatia
- County: Lika-Senj County
- Perušić: 1487
- Founder: Dominic and Gaspar Perušić

Government
  - Mayor: Ivan Turic (HDZ)

Area
  - Municipality: 147.9 sq mi (383.0 km^{2})
  - Urban: 4.8 sq mi (12.5 km^{2})

Population (2021)
  - Municipality: 1,973
  - Density: 13.34/sq mi (5.151/km^{2})
  - Urban: 752
  - Urban density: 156/sq mi (60.2/km^{2})
- Time zone: UTC+1 Central European Time
- Postal code: 53202 Perušić
- Website: perusic.hr

Perušić is a settlement and a municipality in Lika-Senj County, Croatia. In 2011, the municipality had 2,638 inhabitants, while the central settlement had 852. The municipality is within the mountainous Lika region of central Croatia. The Kosinj valley region sprawls alongside it.

Perušić is one of the lowest inhabited municipalities in Croatia, with a shrinking population. Farming and agricultural industries are the main occupations. The small settlements of the municipality are built on hillsides due to frequent flooding.

== Geography ==
The Municipality of Perušić is located in the southeastern part of Lika, at an altitude of 575–600 metres (1,886–1,969 ft), in a valley of the Lika River watershed. It lies in a field, Perušićko polje, bounded by the hills west of Klis and the railway line east of the Old Town of Perušić (Stari grad Perušić a.k.a. Gradina).

Perušić connects to major roadways including the D50 state road, and the Zagreb–Split motorway (A1). The main railway line M604 also connects to Zagreb and Split, with daily passenger and freight service.

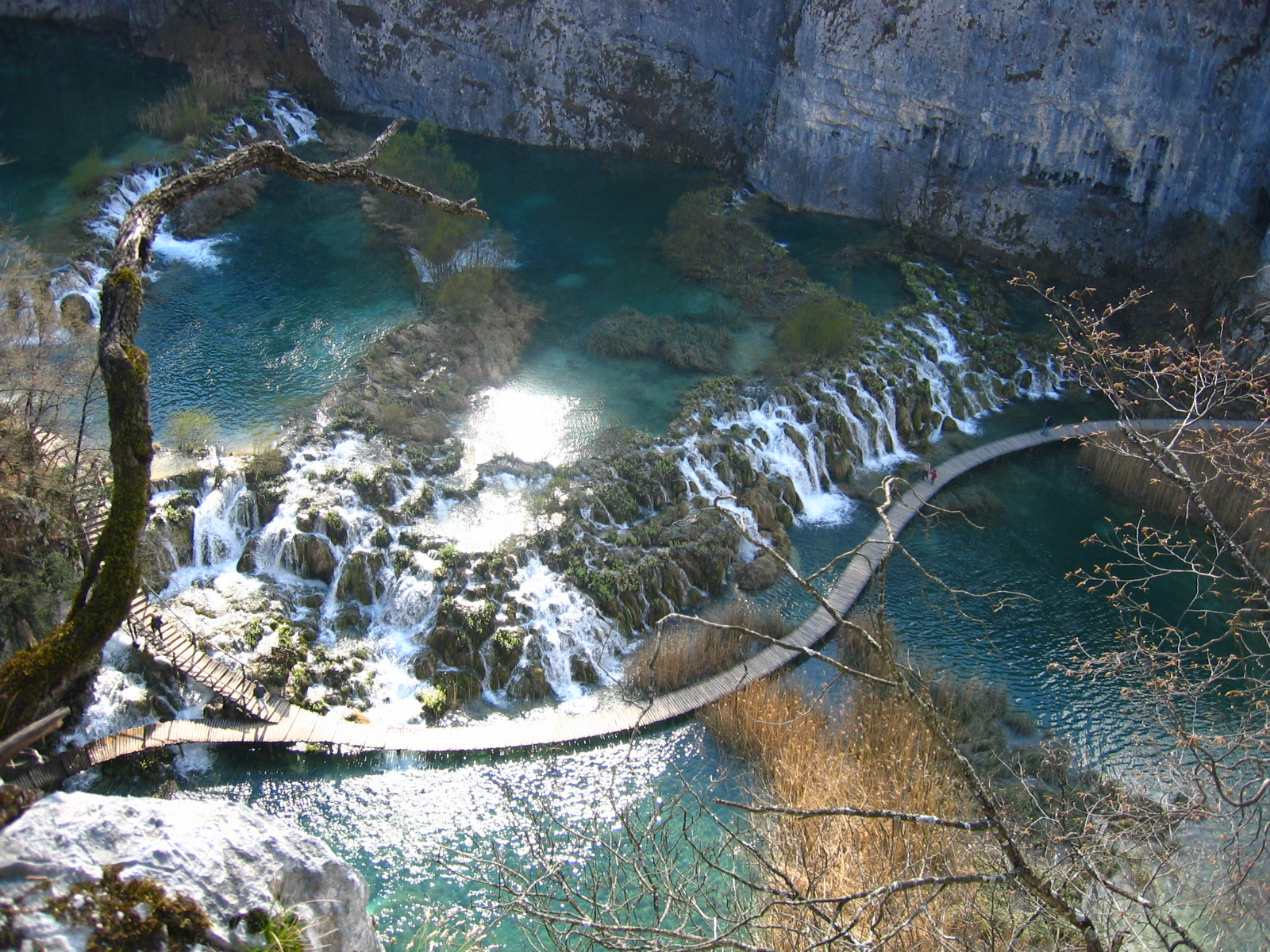
The Kaluđerovac boardwalk near Plitvička Jezera.

== History ==
The region has been inhabited since the ancient times. Stone Age artifacts have been found on the road to Otočac, while more finds come from the Bronze Age including grave sites from the 8th or 9th century BC. In the woods of Begovača near Kosinje there is a Roman monolith engraved with the verdict of a water dispute between Illyrian tribes.

Perušić became an organized settlement in the 16th century, when it was on the border between the Ottoman Empire and European states. It was first called Perušić in 1487. It was founded by brothers Dominik and Gašpar Perušić, from a noble family who came from the hinterland. The family built a hill fortress, known by various names in writings of that time, including Stari grad Perušić (Old Town of Perušić), Gradina (fortified town), and most often Perušićka kula (Perušić tower).

When the Turks conquered Lika and Krbava, c.1527, the fort became the main stronghold of Turkish Lika. This borderland between three empires – the Habsburg monarchy including the remains of the Croatian-Hungarian Empire, the Venetian Republic and the Ottoman Empire – was the scene of constant warfare. Liberation from the Turkish authorities in Lika began in 1685.

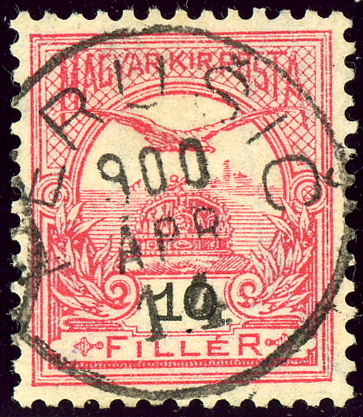
Kingdom of Hungary 10 filler stamp cancelled at Perušić in 1900

Until 1918, Perušić was part of the Austrian monarchy (Kingdom of Croatia-Slavonia after the Compromise of 1867), in the Croatian Military Frontier, administered by the Kommando Ottotschaner Regiment No.2. From the late 19th century to the early 20th century, Perušić was part of the Lika-Krbava County of the Kingdom of Croatia-Slavonia.

During World War II, the town was occupied by Axis troops and was included into the Pavelić's Independent State of Croatia (NDH). On 6 August 1941, the Ustashe killed and burned more than 280 Serbs in Mlakva near Perušić, including 191 children.

After 1945, the forests became general state assets, administered by the District Councils. The Forestry Building in Perušić was erected in 1970.

During the Croatian War of Independence (1991–1995), Perušić was near the front lines. It was not safe even after the stabilization of the battlefield and the international recognition of Croatia as part of the European Community. In addition to artillery attacks, Serbia launched an infantry attack on 19 January 1992 which was repulsed by Croatian troops.

== Population ==
In 2021, the municipality had 1,973 residents in the following 19 settlements:

- Bakovac Kosinjski, population 69
- Bukovac Perušićki, population 66
- Donji Kosinj, population 318
- Gornji Kosinj, population 92
- Kaluđerovac, population 13
- Klenovac, population 30
- Konjsko Brdo, population 92
- Kosa Janjačka, population 69
- Krš, population 23
- Kvarte, population 90
- Lipovo Polje, population 60
- Malo Polje, population 53
- Mezinovac, population 23
- Mlakva, population 31
- Perušić, population 752
- Prvan Selo, population 70
- Selo Sveti Marko, population 20
- Studenci, population 26
- Varoš, population 76
Perušić: Population trends 1857–2021
v

| population | 12087 | 13311 | 12463 | 14363 | 15507 | 15409 | 14359 | 14372 | 11674 | 10958 | 9952 | 8607 | 6379 | 5648 | 3494 | 2638 | 1973 |
| | 1857 | 1869 | 1880 | 1890 | 1900 | 1910 | 1921 | 1931 | 1948 | 1953 | 1961 | 1971 | 1981 | 1991 | 2001 | 2011 | 2021 |

Sources: Croatian Bureau of Statistics publications

According to the 2011 census, the municipality was primarily Croat (90.22%) and Serb (8.49%).

The population of the Municipality has fallen by more than a third between 1991 and 2011. Reasons for this include the emigration of population to more developed areas, attacks during the War of Independence, the aging population, and frequent flooding.

== Politics ==
=== Minority councils and representatives ===
Directly elected minority councils and representatives are tasked with consulting tasks for the local or regional authorities in which they are advocating for minority rights and interests, integration into public life and participation in the management of local affairs. At the 2023 Croatian national minorities councils and representatives elections Serbs of Croatia fulfilled legal requirements to elect 10 members minority council of the Municipality of Perušić but the elections were not held due to the absence of candidatures.

== Climate ==
Climate data for Perušić
| Month | Jan | Feb | Mar | Apr | May | Jun | Jul | Aug | Sep | Oct | Nov | Dec | Year |
|---|---|---|---|---|---|---|---|---|---|---|---|---|---|
| Mean daily maximum °C (°F) | 11 (52) | 11 (52) | 15 (59) | 18 (64) | 24 (75) | 28 (82) | 31 (88) | 31 (88) | 25 (77) | 21 (70) | 15 (59) | 11 (52) | 20.1 (68.2) |
| Daily mean °C (°F) | 6.5 (43.7) | 6 (43) | 9.5 (49.1) | 13 (55) | 18 (64) | 22 (72) | 24.5 (76.1) | 24.5 (76.1) | 19 (66) | 15.5 (59.9) | 10.5 (50.9) | 7 (45) | 15.5 (59.9) |
| Mean daily minimum °C (°F) | 2 (36) | 1 (34) | 4 (39) | 8 (46) | 12 (54) | 16 (61) | 18 (64) | 18 (64) | 13 (55) | 10 (50) | 6 (43) | 3 (37) | 9.3 (48.7) |
| Average precipitation mm (inches) | 50 (2.0) | 43 (1.7) | 58 (2.3) | 61 (2.4) | 49 (1.9) | 31 (1.2) | 23 (0.9) | 42 (1.7) | 76 (3.0) | 91 (3.6) | 92 (3.6) | 92 (3.6) | 708 (27.9) |
| Average rainy days | 11 | 8 | 9 | 11 | 8 | 7 | 5 | 6 | 9 | 10 | 13 | 13 | 110 |
Source: World Weather Online

The Lika region has a temperate oceanic climate with Köppen climate classification Cfb, moderately humid with a warm summer. The Velebit mountain range restricts the thermal influence of the Adriatic Sea, but allows moist air to reach the interior resulting in high precipitation (particularly in winter and autumn). The growing season is 210–250 days, and there are 140–180 days with temperatures above 10 °C (50 °F).

== Economy ==
Farming and agricultural industries are the main occupation. The nearby highway brought rapid economic development, though Perušić remains one of the poorest inhabited municipalities in Croatia.

== Culture ==
=== Literature ===
According to historical documents, Perušić can be called the cradle of Croatian literacy. Shortly after a printing machine was invented in the nearby village of Kosinj, Missale Romanum Glagolitice (Croatian: Misal po zakonu rimskoga dvora) was printed, one of the oldest printed books in Croatia and Europe, with numerous illustrations and ornaments. It was printed in 1483, just 28 years after the Gutenberg Bible.

=== Sport ===
The local football team is NK Perušić.

== Landmarks ==
=== Grabovača ===
Grabovača is a cave park situated between the Lika karstic plains and fields, 2 kilometres (1.2 mi) from the center of Perušić. It is 770 metres (2,530 ft) above sea level at the mid-elevations of the Velebit mountains, near the karst basin of the river Lika. In an area of 1.5 km^{2} (0.58 sq mi) there are an abundance of underground karst forms, complex calcite formations. The park represents one-quarter of the protected caves in Croatia. The caves are closed to the public in winter.

=== Protected landscape Risovac-Grabovača ===
It covers the area of 5620,72 ha. Its unique geological feature is Velebit breccia rock. There are 118 species of plants (16 strictly protected, 6 endemic), 19 species of cave fauna (Typhlotrechus bilimekii kiesenwetteri, endemic beetle), 15 species of butterflies (8 strictly protected), 81 bird species (24 strictly prohibited), 10 strictly prohibited species of bats and more than 20 species of mammals. Golden eagle is critically endangered.

=== Kosinj Bridge ===
Kosinj Bridge is a 70-metre (230 ft) stone bridge crossing the river Lika, connecting Upper and Lower Kosinj. It was designed in the 19th century by architect Milivoj Frković, built using an early Croatian bridge-building technique known as uklinjenje kamena (clipping stone).

=== Kruščica ===
Lake Krušćica is an artificial lake and reservoir created in 1966 to help control flooding of the Lika. Behind a dam 80 metres (260 ft) high, the reservoir contains a flooded village with the church of St. Ilya.

=== Old town Perušić ===
Old town, known as "Gradina" or "Turkish tower" (Croatian: Turska kula) on the locality Vrhovina was first mentioned in 1071. It was ruled by Frankopan family. Town was renamed in 1487 and bestowed to the brothers Perušić. During Ottoman occupation (until 1696) Perušić became Turkish stronghold due to its position and proximity to the Venetian Republic and Habsburg monarchy. After the liberation of Lika and Krbava by the Catholic priest Marko Mesić, remaining Turkish population were baptised. Perušić was first part of Croatian Military Frontier, then in 19th century part of Banate of Croatia.

== Notable people ==
- Ana Karić actress
- Mirko Lulić football player
- Mike Uremovich, indoor soccer player
