= Donji Kosinj =

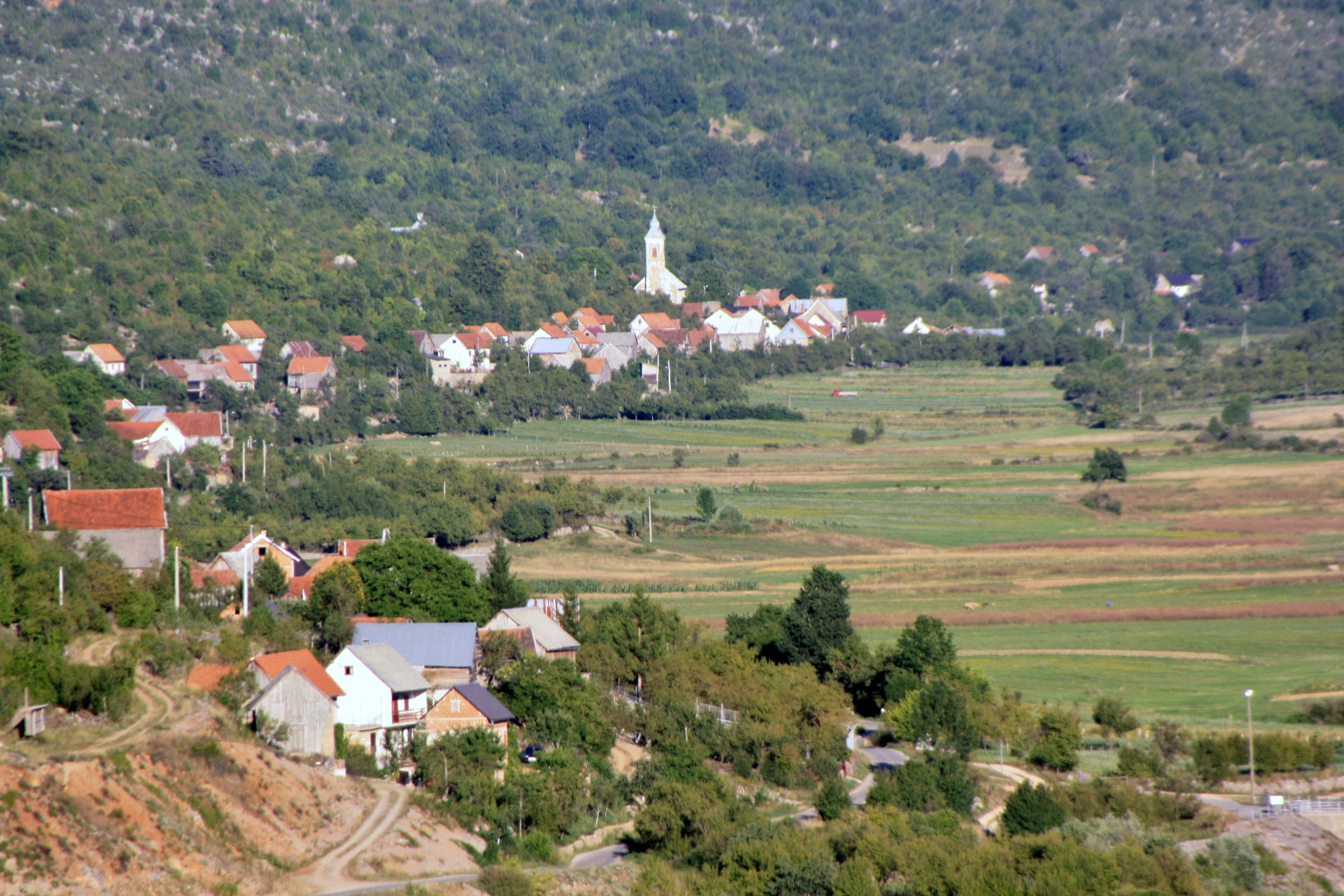
- Interactive map of Donji Kosinj
- Location within Croatia
- Coordinates: 44.7573°N 15.2567°E
- Country: Croatia
- County: Lika-Senj
- Municipality: Perušić

Area
  - Total: 61.2 km^{2} (23.6 sq mi)

Population (2021)
  - Total: 318
  - Density: 5.20/km^{2} (13.5/sq mi)
- Time zone: UTC+1 (CET)
  - Summer (DST): UTC+2 (CEST)
- Postal code: 53202 Perušić
- Area code: +385 (0)53

Donji Kosinj is a village in Perušić municipality, Lika-Senj County, Croatia. It is located in Kosinj Valley, near the Lika river. In 2021, its population was 318.

== Demographics ==
Donji Kosinj: Population trends 1857–2021
v

population	2108	3121	3025	2491	2515	2426	2342	2373	2175	1972	1695	1573	1220	1025	678	494	318
	1857	1869	1880	1890	1900	1910	1921	1931	1948	1953	1961	1971	1981	1991	2001	2011	2021

Note:Contains data for Krš in 1869 and 1880, as well as data for Mlakva from 1857 to 1880. Sources: Croatian Bureau of Statistics publications
