= Don Cesar =

Don Cesar may refer to:

== Stage works ==
- Don Cesar, an alternative name for the 1844 play Don César de Bazan by Adolphe d'Ennery and Dumanoir
- Don Cesar (Dellinger), an 1885 operette by Rudolf Dellinger based on the play by d'Ennery and Dumanoir
- Don César de Bazan, an 1872 opera by Jules Massenet based on the play by d'Ennery and Dumanoir
- Don César a spanilá Magelona, an 1852 opera by František Škroup
- Don Cezar od Bazana, an 1877 play by Nikola Kokotović

== Films ==
- Don Cesar, Count of Irun, a 1918 Austrian silent film based on the play by d'Ennery and Dumanoir
- Don Cesare di Bazan, a 1942 Italian film based on the play by d'Ennery and Dumanoir

== Characters in fiction ==
- Don Cesar, a character in the 1803 play The Bride of Messina by Friedrich Schiller
- Don Cesar, a character in the 1825 play Love's Victory by George Hyde
- Don Cesar, a character in the 1838 play Ruy Blas by Victor Hugo
- Don Cesar, a character in the 1845 opera Maritana by William Vincent Wallace; also based on the play by d'Ennery and Dumanoir
- Don Cesar, a character in the 1884 opera The Bride of Messina by Zdeněk Fibich
- Don Cesar, a character in the 1894 opera Donna Diana by Emil von Reznicek
- Don Cesar, a character in the 1927 film Yo soy tu padre
- Don Cesar, a character in the 1944 film The Lieutenant Nun
- Don César, a character in the 1950 film Nobody's Wife
- Don Cesar, a character in the 1956 film Afternoon of the Bulls
- Don Cesar, a character in the 1971 film Delusions of Grandeur
- Don Cesar, a character in the 1994 telenovela Imperio de cristal
- Don Cesar, a character in the 2008 telenovela Un gancho al corazón
- Don Cesar Alcazan, a character in the 1952 film The Dream of Zorro
- Don Cesar de Achával y Acháva, a character in the 1978 film La comadrita
- Don César de Bazan, a character in the 1948 film Ruy Blas
- Don Cesar de Echague, a character in the 1956 film The Coyote's Justice
- Don Cesar de Vega (a.k.a. Zorro), a character in the 1925 film Don Q, Son of Zorro
- Don Cesar Zaragoza, a character in the 2010 Philippine television drama Kristine

== Other ==
- Don César de Echagüe, a 1946 novel featuring the El Coyote (character)
- The Don CeSar, a historic hotel in Florida
