= Malo Polje =

Malo Polje, which translates as Little Field in Serbo-Croatian, may refer to:

- Malo Polje, Slovenia, a village near Ajdovščina
- Malo Polje, Croatia, a village near Perušić
- Malo Polje, Mostar, a village near Mostar, Bosnia and Herzegovina
- Malo Polje (Han Pijesak), a village near Han Pijesak, Bosnia and Herzegovina
