= Lake Krušćica =

Lake in Croatia

Lake Kruscica
- Krušćičko jezero (Croatian)
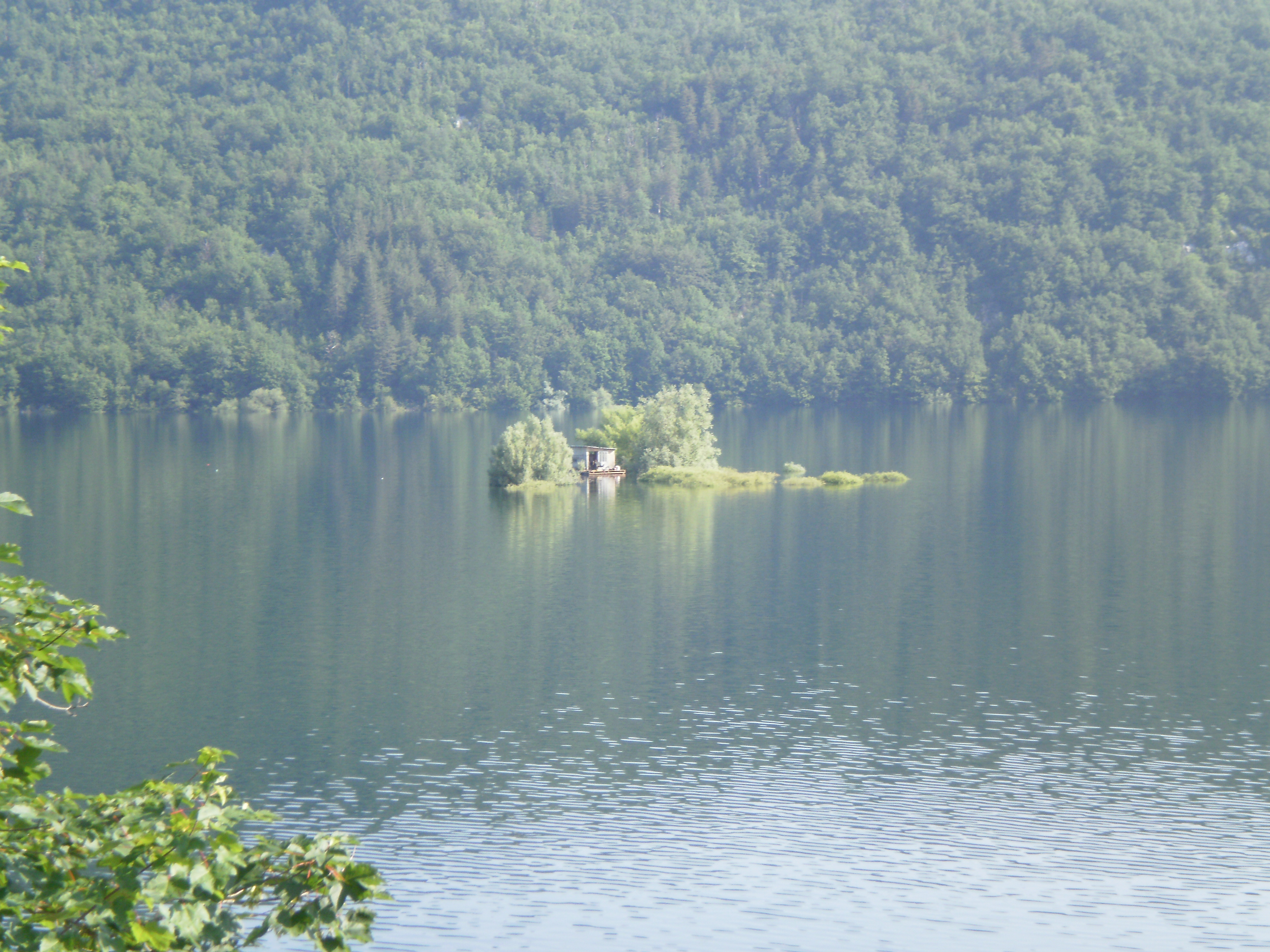

- Location within Croatia
- Interactive map of Lake Kruscica
- Location: Kosinj, Lika, Croatia
- Coordinates: 44.689678°N 15.270821°E
- River sources: Lika River
- Surface area: 3.9 km^{2} (1.5 sq mi)
- Surface elevation: 554 m (1,818 ft)

Lake Krušćica (Croatian: Krušćičko jezero) is an artificial lake located in Kosinj, Lika, Croatia. It is administratively divided between the municipalities of Gospić and Perušić of the Lika-Senj County. The total lake area is 3.9 square kilometres (1.5 sq mi), while its elevation is 554 m.a.s.l.

Lake Krušćica was created by damming the Lika River.
