= Studenci =

Studenci may refer to:

- Studenci, Ljubuški, a village in Bosnia and Herzegovina
- Studenci, Nevesinje, a village in Bosnia and Herzegovina
- Studenci, Teslić, a village near Teslić in Bosnia and Herzegovina
- Studenci, Maribor, a village in Slovenia
- Studenci, Lika-Senj County, a village near Perušić, Croatia
- Studenci, Split-Dalmatia County, a village near Lovreć, Croatia
