= Kaluđerovac =

Village in Perušić, Lika, Croatia

- Location within Croatia
- Coordinates: 44°39′N 15°19′E
- Country: Croatia
- County: Lika-Senj
- Municipality: Perušić

Area
  - Total: 12.3 km^{2} (4.7 sq mi)

Population (2021)
  - Total: 13
  - Density: 1.1/km^{2} (2.7/sq mi)
- Time zone: UTC+1 (CET)
  - Summer (DST): UTC+2 (CEST)

Kaluđerovac is a village in the Perušić municipality in the Lika region of central Croatia. The 2011 population was 24, ethnic Croats.

The 1712–14 census of Lika and Krbava registered 146 inhabitants, out of whom 112 were Catholic Carniolans, 27 were Catholic Croats, and seven were Catholic Bunjevci.
