= Kosinj =

Coordinates: 44°44′11″N 15°16′36″E

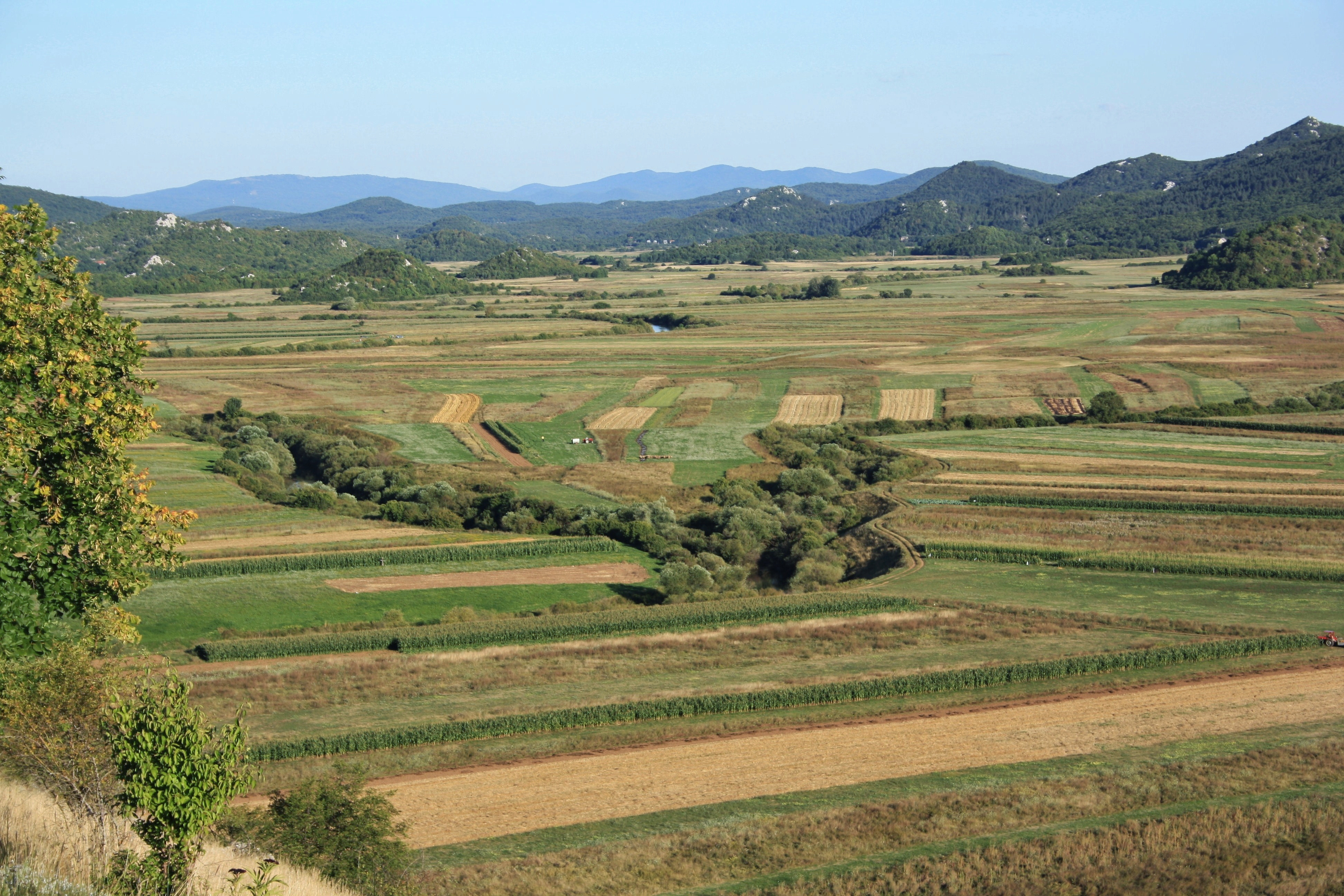
Kosinj Valley

Kosinj, also known as Kosinj Valley, is a hilly region in Perušić municipality, Lika-Senj County, Croatia. It contains three villages: Gornji Kosinj and Donji Kosinj, which are connected by the Kosinj Bridge on the Lika river, and Bakovac Kosinjski. The population of the villages is 752 according to the 2011 census.

== History ==
=== Middle Ages ===
Many Croatian archaeological sites, such as Bočaj, Basarica, Ribnik/grad Kosinj, Pisani kamen, Prespa, Mlakvena Greda etc. state that there was evidence of life in the valley since the Roman era. Many medieval and historical records say that the city Ribnik or Kosinjgrad or Lasch de Kosin, the princes who reigned the year of our Lord mentions Kosinjski first in the year 1071 in the charter of the Croatian king Peter Krešimir IV.

=== Renaissance ===
One of the oldest printers in south Slavic, that wrote in Glagolitic breviary, was the first and oldest book known to have been printed on Croatian soil using the Gutenberg press. An incomplete copy is kept in the Library Marciana in Venice, and a smaller fragment (six parchment leaves) was discovered in the Vatican Library. A short time after the printing press was invented, founded by the princes Frankopans in the village of Kosinj, the first Croatian printing. It was printed, also for ecclesiastical purposes, and the first Croatian printed book in the year 1483. Kosinj, as a symbol of Croatian culture, has its place in the Gutenberg Museum in Mainz, where the first map of printers contains the name of Kosinj.

=== Ottoman Era ===
The Kosinj area remained after the Turks from the end of thirty Vlach families. They are the Krajina authorities have expressed the wish to remain in their homes. Since the end Kosinj remained rather poorly populated, Krajina administration has moved here from the Croatian settlers Ogulin and upper Pokuplje. The description of Kosinj by Bishop Glavinić, says that this place is divided into Upper, Middle and Lower Village. In the Upper Kosinj Glavinić is found forty houses of Croatian immigrants from Pokuplje. In the Middle Kosinj, a hundred houses Vlach population, lived in the Lower Kosinj Croats who moved here from Ogulin. In all three Kosinj village was then about 400 Croats and 300 Blaise. The Border writings known as the surnames of immigrants who are late 17th century welcomed to Kosinj.

In later development Kosinje Central Village changed its name to Zamost. Thus up to now remained only 2 Kosinje, Lower and Upper. The upper creek is about Bakovac and its compositions with the river Lika, and the lower few kilometers further north along the creek mentioned.

== Geography ==
The area is full of farmland that contains cattle and canola farming.

The character of the river meander (which is 78 km from its second-largest underground river in Europe) that winds up his field abyss Begovac (in literature known as the Markov gap depth 1725 m) were probably caught the biggest carp in Europe. The Lika river abounds in fish resources, as well as the accumulation lake Kruscica (created in 1971, it is suitable for water sports and swimming in calm waters). The variety of wildlife includes catfish and carp also: pike, chub, crvenorepke, white amur, sunstroke, and babushkas.

In the Kosinj valley are caves and sinkholes. There are numerous wells and ponds, wells and springs. As one of the symbols of the dominant Kosinje its appearance imposed Kalic mountain peak (969 m) from which magnificent views of the Zavižan, Krasno, parts of Perusic in Kosinj, and a large part of the valley.

== Culture ==
Denison is the culture and history is certainly the most important place as the first Croatian printing of books, missals Kosinjski, 1483rd year, which was printed in the mobile shop royalty Anz Frankopan. To date, only ten copies preserved and valuable Glagolitic books, whose circulation was printed partly on paper and partly on parchment. Kosinj printing otisnula is most likely a significant other Croatian incunabula.

There is many churches in the area, such as:

- St Antun Church
- St Vid Church
- St John the Baptist Church
- St Anne Church
- St Petar i Pavao Church
- St Joseph Church

There was evidence of seven churches and two monasteries in Kosinj, written in Glagolitic alphabet. And today many churches in Kosinj, other than those use and enrich the history and heritage to the miraculous chapel in Zakosnjak. The wall of the church of Sv. Vida has three panels of the Glagolitic summer Lord 1500 and is particularly interesting emblem of Prince Anž (Ivan) VIII Frankapan Brinjski placed upside down above the door. Inside the walls it the church of Sv. John the Baptist (1650) that was fitted with two large square stone urns with Latin inscriptions, and inside the church, there are three large sarcophagus serving as aid treatment or altars. Concrete pedestal of the crucifix of the church cover the stone urns.

== Sources ==
- Ivan Mance - Kosinj izvorište hrvatske tiskane riječi, Split, 2013.
