= Mezinovac =

- Location within Croatia
- Coordinates: 44°40′N 15°21′E
- Country: Croatia
- County: Lika-Senj
- Municipality: Perušić

Area
  - Total: 3.9 km^{2} (1.5 sq mi)

Population (2021)
  - Total: 23
  - Density: 5.9/km^{2} (15/sq mi)
- Time zone: UTC+1 (CET)
  - Summer (DST): UTC+2 (CEST)

Mezinovac is a village in Perušić, Croatia. In 2011, the population was 24.
