= Selo Sveti Marko =

- Location within Croatia
- Coordinates: 44°40′23″N 15°21′37″E
- Country: Croatia
- County: Lika-Senj
- Municipality: Perušić

Area
  - Total: 2.5 km^{2} (0.97 sq mi)

Population (2021)
  - Total: 20
  - Density: 8.0/km^{2} (21/sq mi)
- Time zone: UTC+1 (CET)
  - Summer (DST): UTC+2 (CEST)

Selo Sveti Marko is a village located 3 km north-west from Perušić in Lika-Senj County, Croatia. The 2011 population was 34.
