= Bukovac Perušićki =

- Location within Croatia
- Coordinates: 44°38′57″N 15°24′38″E
- Country: Croatia
- County: Lika-Senj
- Municipality: Perušić

Area
  - Total: 8.8 km^{2} (3.4 sq mi)

Population (2021)
  - Total: 66
  - Density: 7.5/km^{2} (19/sq mi)
- Time zone: UTC+1 (CET)
  - Summer (DST): UTC+2 (CEST)

Bukovac Perušićki is a village in Perušić, Croatia. The 2011 population was 91.
