= Kvarte =

- Location within Croatia
- Coordinates: 44°40′40″N 15°23′00″E
- Country: Croatia
- County: Lika-Senj
- Municipality: Perušić

Area
  - Total: 9.8 km^{2} (3.8 sq mi)

Population (2021)
  - Total: 90
  - Density: 9.2/km^{2} (24/sq mi)
- Time zone: UTC+1 (CET)
  - Summer (DST): UTC+2 (CEST)

Kvarte is a village within the municipality of Perušić in Lika-Senj County, Croatia, population 193 (2011 census).
