= Mike Uremovich (soccer) =

Croatian-Canadian soccer player

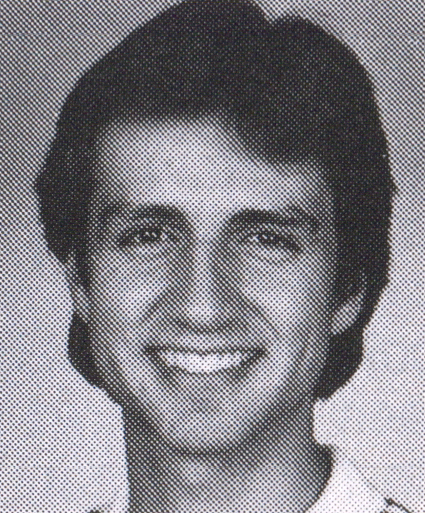
- Uremovich circa 1984

Personal information
- Date of birth: June 5, 1962 (age 64)
- Place of birth: Perušić, Croatia, Yugoslavia
- Height: 6 ft 0 in (1.83 m)
- Position: Defender

Youth career
- 1980: Canada U-19

Senior career*
Years	Team	Apps	(Gls)
1980–1981	New York Arrows (indoor)	33	(2)
1981–1982	Montreal Manic (indoor)	16	(3)
1982	Montreal Manic	2	(0)
1983–1984	Phoenix Pride (indoor)	47	(5)
1984–1987	Dallas Sidekicks (indoor)	144	(15)
1987–1988	Baltimore Blast (indoor)	51	(8)
1990–1992	Dallas Sidekicks (indoor)	87	(12)
- * Club domestic league appearances and goals

Mike Uremovich is a retired indoor soccer player. He played as a defender. Born in Croatia, he is a Canadian citizen.

== Early life ==
Mike Uremovich was born on June 5, 1962, in Perušić, Croatia, which was part of Yugoslavia at the time.

He attended Applewood Heights Secondary School in Mississauga, Canada, where he played as a centre back for the Applewood Axemen. During high school, he also played for the Cabbagetown Royals in the Junior B division of the Canadian National Soccer League.

Uremovich also played for Canada's Olympic and national youth teams. In March 1980, he was one of 22 players selected by Canada Soccer for a youth training camp.

== Career ==
In December 1979, he was drafted by the Toronto Blizzard in the North American Soccer League draft. This came as a surprise to Uremovich, who was still in grade 12 of high school and had not been aware he was eligible for the draft. He did not ultimately play for the Blizzard.

In November 1980, the New York Arrows signed Uremovich ahead of the 1980–81 Major Indoor Soccer League season. In the regular season, he notched 4 goals and 2 assists across 33 appearances. In the playoffs, he had 2 assists across 5 appearances as the team went on to win the 1981 MISL championship.

Uremovich played for Montreal Manic for the 1981–82 indoor season and the 1982 outdoor season.

Uremovich joined the Phoenix Pride for the 1983–84 season, during which he notched 5 goals and 11 assists across 47 appearances.

In 1984, Uremovich became the first player to join the roster of expansion franchise Dallas Sidekicks. He scored six goals and made 14 assists in the 1984–85 season. Uremovich remained with the Sidekicks for three seasons. In the 1986–87 season, he had five goals and ten assists as the Sidekicks won the MISL championship.

In August 1987, Uremovich signed with the Baltimore Blast. Uremovich, who was one of the last four original Sidekicks players, was reportedly unhappy with offers he received from Dallas. His contract with the Sidekicks expired on September 30, 1987, after which his two-year contract with the Blast for $110,000 began.

In June 1988, Uremovich was the first Blast player offered a contract for the new season, but after four teams folded and the MISL's future became uncertain, Uremovich walked away from negotiations. Negotiations were briefly restarted in October 1988 after Blast management released defender Mike Reynolds for medical reasons. However, Uremovich ultimately turned down their offer to consider either returning to the Sidekicks or leaving soccer altogether.

In 1990, after two years away from soccer, Uremovich returned to the Sidekicks. In September 1991, Uremovich was renewed on a one-year contract. Uremovich missed several weeks of the 1991–92 season with a strained abdominal muscle. Uremovich did not return to the Sidekicks after 1992.

== Personal life ==
Uremovich attended the University of British Columbia.
