= Prvan Selo =

Village in the Municipality of Perušić, Lika-Senj County, Croatia

- Location within Croatia
- Coordinates: 44°38′N 15°23′E
- Country: Croatia
- County: Lika-Senj
- Municipality: Perušić

Area
  - Total: 2.7 km^{2} (1.0 sq mi)

Population (2021)
  - Total: 70
  - Density: 26/km^{2} (67/sq mi)
- Time zone: UTC+1 (CET)
  - Summer (DST): UTC+2 (CEST)

Prvan Selo is a village in Perušić, Croatia.
