= Church of Saint Anthony of Padua, Gornji Kosinj =

Parish Church of Saint Anthony of Padua
- Župna crkva svetog Antuna Padovanskog
- Parish Church of Saint Anthony of Padua
- 44°42′57″N 15°16′37″E
- Location: Gornji Kosinj
- Country: Croatia
- Denomination: Roman Catholic

History
- Status: Parish church
- Dedication: Saint Anthony of Padua

Architecture
- Functional status: Active
- Style: Baroque
- Completed: 1692; 334 years ago

Administration
- Archdiocese: Diocese of Gospić-Senj
- Parish: Parish of Saint Anthony of Padua - Gornji Kosinj

The Church of Saint Anthony of Padua (Croatian: Crkva svetog Antuna Padovanskog) is a Roman Catholic church in Gornji Kosinj, Croatia.

It has a polygonal sanctuary, sacristy, and bell tower along the main facade.

== History ==
The church was built in 1692, after the expulsion of the Ottomans.
