= Nikola Kokotović =

Serbian-Croatian playwright and translator

- Born: 7 September 1859; Gornji Kosinj, Austrian Empire
- Died: 6 January 1917 (aged 57); Zagreb, Austria-Hungary
- Occupations: Playwright; Translator
- Writing career
- Language: Croatian

Nikola Kokotović (7 September 1859, Gornji Kosinj, Austrian Empire – 6 January 1917, Zagreb, Austria-Hungary) was a Serbian and Croatian playwright and translator who lived and worked in Zagreb most of his life, though his translated plays were performed in Belgrade as well. He was born to Serb parents in Gornji Kosinj. He was a friend of Ognjeslav Utješenović Ostrožinski, August Harambašić, and Petar Preradović.

== Works ==
- Bestidnici (Émile Augier's Les Effrontés), translated and premiered in 1889;
- Don Cezar od Bazana (Dumanoir and Adolphe d'Ennery's Don César de Bazan, based on the drama Ruy Blas by Victor Hugo), translated and first staged in Belgrade on 16 May 1877.
