= Konjsko Brdo =

- Location within Croatia
- Coordinates: 44°40′N 15°24′E
- Country: Croatia
- County: Lika-Senj
- Municipality: Perušić

Area
  - Total: 12.9 km^{2} (5.0 sq mi)

Population (2021)
  - Total: 92
  - Density: 7.1/km^{2} (18/sq mi)
- Time zone: UTC+1 (CET)
  - Summer (DST): UTC+2 (CEST)

Konjsko Brdo is a village in the municipality of Perušić, Lika-Senj County, Croatia.

== Population ==
The population in 2011 was 118.
