= Bočaj =

Bočaj is an archaeological site in Kosinj, Croatia.
