= Lipovo Polje =

- Location within Croatia
- Coordinates: 44°45′52″N 15°10′28″E
- Country: Croatia
- County: Lika-Senj
- Municipality: Perušić

Area
  - Total: 66.3 km^{2} (25.6 sq mi)

Population (2021)
  - Total: 60
  - Density: 0.90/km^{2} (2.3/sq mi)
- Time zone: UTC+1 (CET)
  - Summer (DST): UTC+2 (CEST)

Lipovo Polje is a village in Perušić municipality, Croatia. The population in 2011 was 122.
