= Vukelić =

Vukelić (Serbian: Вукелић) is a Serbian and a Croatian surname.

It is one of the most common surnames in the Lika-Senj County of Croatia.

It may refer to:

- Branko Vukelić (1958–2013), politician
- Branko Vukelić (1904–1945), spy
- Milan Vukelić (1936–2012), footballer
- Vesna Vukelić Vendi (born 1971), singer
- William Vukelić (born 1998), alpine skier
