= Malo Polje, Croatia =

Malo Polje
- Location within Croatia
- Coordinates: 44°39′N 15°21′E
- Country: Croatia
- County: Lika-Senj
- Municipality: Perušić

Area
  - Total: 4.8 km^{2} (1.9 sq mi)

Population (2021)
  - Total: 53
  - Density: 11/km^{2} (29/sq mi)
- Time zone: UTC+1 (CET)
  - Summer (DST): UTC+2 (CEST)

Malo Polje is a village in Perušić, Croatia. The 2011 population was 74.
