= Mlakva, Perušić =

Mlakva Млаква
- Village
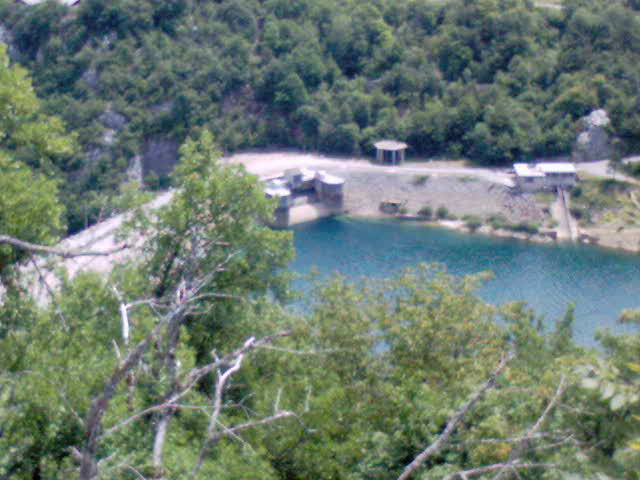

- Location within Croatia
- Coordinates: 44°41′57″N 15°17′18″E
- Country: Croatia
- County: Lika-Senj
- Municipality: Perušić

Area
  - Total: 20.4 km^{2} (7.9 sq mi)
- Elevation: 508 m (1,667 ft)

Population (2021)
  - Total: 31
  - Density: 1.5/km^{2} (3.9/sq mi)
- Time zone: UTC+01:00 (CET)
  - Summer (DST): UTC+02:00 (CEST)

Mlakva is a village in Perušić municipality, Croatia.

== History ==
During World War II, as part of their genocide targeting ethnic Serbs, the Croatian fascist Ustaše regime killed and burned more than 280 Serb villagers in Mlakva on 6 August 1941, including 191 children.

== Demographics ==
The 2011 population was 51.
