= Krš, Croatia =

Village in Perušić, Croatia

Krš
- Location within Croatia
- Coordinates: 44°44′58″N 15°20′45″E
- Country: Croatia
- County: Lika-Senj
- Municipality: Perušić

Area
  - Total: 24.9 km^{2} (9.6 sq mi)

Population (2021)
  - Total: 23
  - Density: 0.92/km^{2} (2.4/sq mi)
- Time zone: UTC+1 (CET)
  - Summer (DST): UTC+2 (CEST)

Krš is a village in Perušić, Croatia. It had a population of 32 in 2011.
