= Gašpar Perušić =

Gašpar Perušić (died 1507) was a Croatian nobleman, who was one of the founders of Perušić, along with his brother Dominik Perušić. Gašpar and his brother came from a Croatian noble family. In 1487, along with his brother, they founded Perušić, which got its name from their last name. He was a gubernatorial governor. He is known for signing the Peace of Pressburg which guaranteed the right of succession to the Croatian throne to the House of Habsburg.
