= Kosa Janjačka =

- Location within Croatia
- Coordinates: 44°42′36″N 15°26′04″E
- Country: Croatia
- County: Lika-Senj
- Municipality: Perušić

Area
  - Total: 60.6 km^{2} (23.4 sq mi)

Population (2021)
  - Total: 69
  - Density: 1.1/km^{2} (2.9/sq mi)
- Time zone: UTC+1 (CET)
  - Summer (DST): UTC+2 (CEST)

Kosa Janjačka is a village in Perušić, Croatia. The population as of 2011 is 98.
