= Vladimir Fran Mažuranić =

Vladimir Fran Mažuranić (March 28, 1859 – August 21, 1928) was a Croatian writer.

He was born in Novi Vinodolski. After finishing the cavalry cadet school in Hranice, Moravia, and achieving the rank of a cavalry captain, he was discharged from the army in 1900 for his "restless life". Afterwards he traveled the world, never to come back to his country of birth.

His first pieces as a writer were short stories published in Vienac 1885, reminiscent of the work of Ivan Turgenev. Forty or them were compiled in a collection Lišće ("Leaves", 1887). His stories were written with a penchant for concise, gnomic utterance and with a strong patriotic line, representing a role model of the genre in the Croatian literature. He reappeared as writer only in 1927, when Matica hrvatska published a book of his stories Od zore do mraka ("From dawn to dusk"). Twelve of the short stories that the editors omitted were published separately in 1928 Od zore do mraka: dopunjak izdanju Matice hrvatske).

He died in Berlin.
