= Studenci, Lika-Senj County =

Studenci
- Location within Croatia
- Coordinates: 44°42′38″N 15°20′55″E
- Country: Croatia
- County: Lika-Senj
- Municipality: Perušić

Area
  - Total: 11.1 km^{2} (4.3 sq mi)

Population (2021)
  - Total: 26
  - Density: 2.3/km^{2} (6.1/sq mi)
- Time zone: UTC+1 (CET)
  - Summer (DST): UTC+2 (CEST)

Studenci is a village in Perušić, Croatia. The 2011 census counted 44 residents.

== Demographics ==
Studenci: Population trends 1857–2021
v

population	431	443	439	432	500	436	454	444	242	252	252	233	172	144	77	44	26
	1857	1869	1880	1890	1900	1910	1921	1931	1948	1953	1961	1971	1981	1991	2001	2011	2021

Sources: Croatian Bureau of Statistics publications
