= Mirko Lulić =

Croatian footballer

Personal information
- Full name: Mirko Lulić
- Date of birth: 6 January 1962 (age 64)
- Place of birth: Kosa Janjačka, SR Croatia; SFR Yugoslavia
- Position: Defender

Senior career*
Years	Team	Apps	(Gls)
1979–1984	Osijek	89	(0)
1984–1989	Dinamo Zagreb	80	(2)
1991–1992	Croatia Đakovo		
1992–1993	Dubrava		
1993	Dinamo Zagreb	7	(1)
1994–1995	Osijek	51	(0)
- * Club domestic league appearances and goals

Mirko Lulić (born 6 January 1962) is a Croatian former football player. He spent his career playing in the top flights of Yugoslavia and later Croatia.

== Club career ==
Born in Kosa Janjačka, SR Croatia while still within SFR Yugoslavia, Lulić played with NK Osijek from 1979 until 1984. According to various internet player history pages, in 1988 he moved to one of their main Yugoslav First League rivals, Red Star Belgrade where he played the 1988–89 season. But, that is not correct fact. During 1988-89 season, he played for Dinamo both in European matches in October 1988 and in Yugoslav league matches during 1989 spring. Match reports of both teams are the proof.

After 1988-89 season, he did not play serious professional football actively for three years. In summer 1992 he returned to football but Dinamo Zagreb did not give him a chance for playing so he went to play the following season for second tier club NK Dubrava helping it win a promotion. While playing for Dubrava on 18 December 1992, he was in team in the international friendly match against Albania national football team.

Later, in 1993 he returned to Dinamo Zagreb, renamed by then to Croatia Zagreb, and played the first half of the 1993–94 season, now in an independent Croatian First League. During the winter break of that season he returned to NK Osijek, and played with Osijek in the Croatian championship until 1996.

== Honours ==
Dinamo Zagreb

- Croatian Cup: 1994
