= Gornji Kosinj =

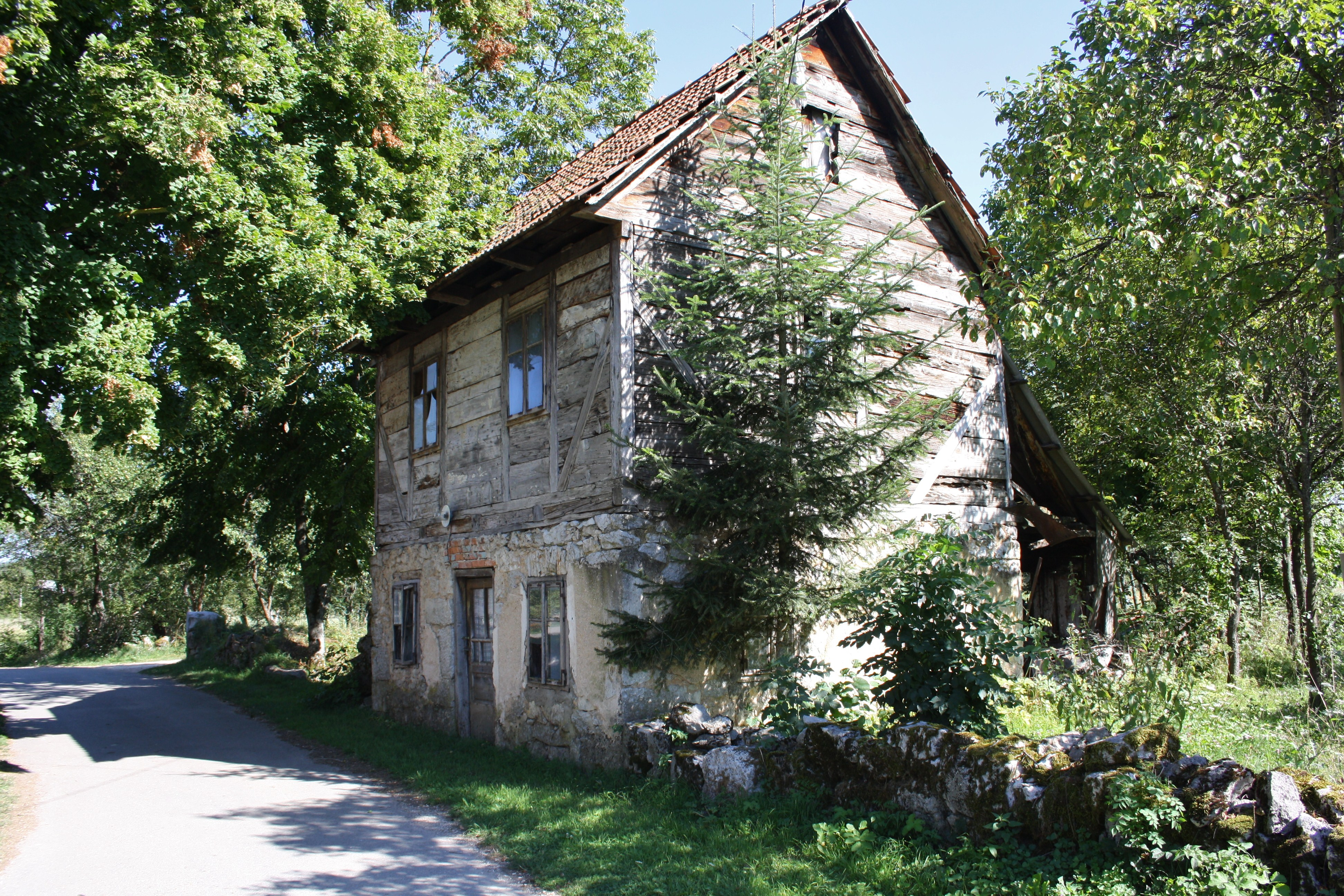
- Interactive map of Gornji Kosinj
- Location within Croatia
- Coordinates: 44°42′56″N 15°16′33″E
- Country: Croatia
- County: Lika-Senj
- Municipality: Perušić

Area
  - Total: 14.0 km^{2} (5.4 sq mi)

Population (2021)
  - Total: 92
  - Density: 6.6/km^{2} (17/sq mi)
- Time zone: UTC+1 (CET)
  - Summer (DST): UTC+2 (CEST)
- Postal code: 53202 Perušić
- Area code: +385 (0)53

Gornji Kosinj is a village in Perušić municipality, Lika-Senj County, Croatia. It is located in Kosinj Valley, near the Lika river. In 2021, its population was 92. The Church of Saint Anthony of Padua stands in the village.

== Demographics ==
Gornji Kosinj: Population trends 1857–2021
v

population	806	2081	2176	1397	1409	1407	1162	1211	1076	969	848	775	562	344	192	132	92
	1857	1869	1880	1890	1900	1910	1921	1931	1948	1953	1961	1971	1981	1991	2001	2011	2021

Note:Contains data for Bakovac Kosinjski in 1869 and 1880. Sources: Croatian Bureau of Statistics publications
