= Bakovac Kosinjski =

Croatian village

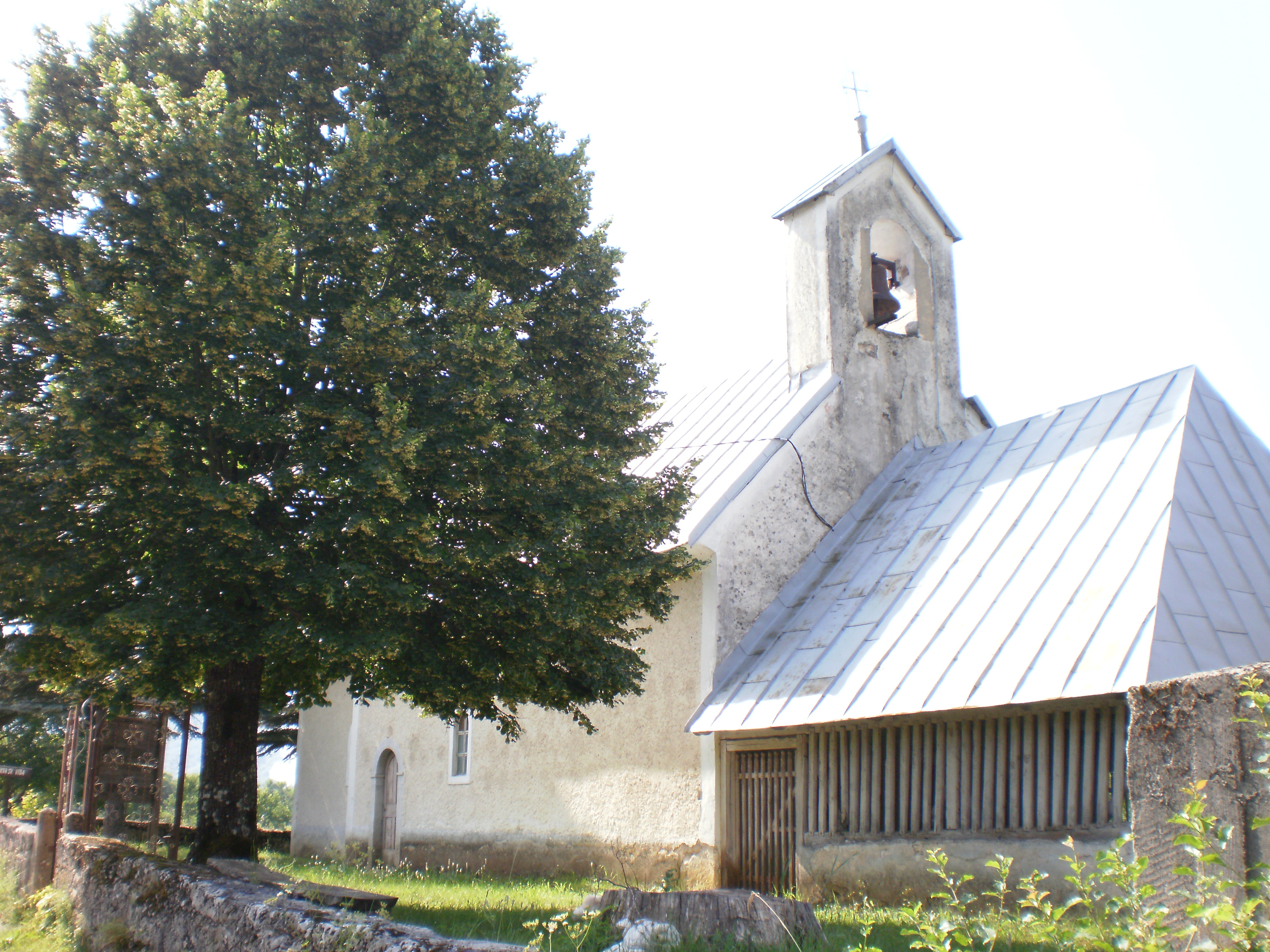
- Church of St Vitus

- Location within Croatia
- Coordinates: 44°42′40″N 15°12′32″E
- Country: Croatia
- County: Lika-Senj
- Municipality: Perušić

Area
  - Total: 46.2 km^{2} (17.8 sq mi)

Population (2021)
  - Total: 69
  - Density: 1.5/km^{2} (3.9/sq mi)
- Time zone: UTC+1 (CET)
  - Summer (DST): UTC+2 (CEST)

Bakovac Kosinjski is a village in the municipality of Perušić in Lika-Senj County, Croatia.

== History ==
Bakovac Kosinjski was a settlement of the mediaeval Buško clan of Ljupčoć; three plates with Glagolitic inscriptions and the coat of arms of the Frankopan counts have been found in the ruins of the old chapel.

== Church ==
Church of St. Vitus
