= August Harambašić =

Croatian writer, poet and politician

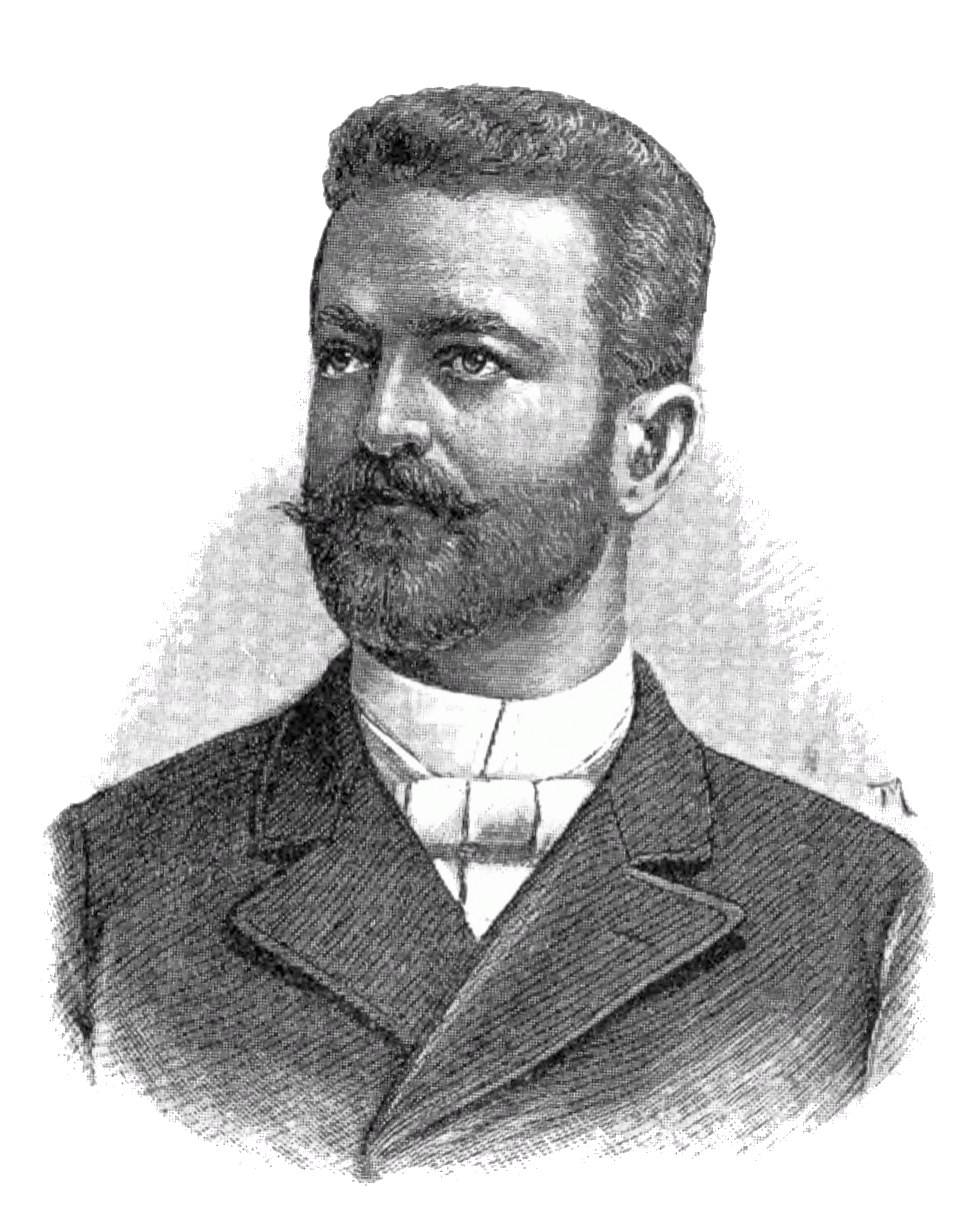
- Born: July 14, 1861; Donji Miholjac, Kingdom of Croatia, Austrian Empire (now Zagreb, Croatia)
- Died: July 16, 1911 (aged 50); Zagreb, Kingdom of Croatia-Slavonia, Austria-Hungary (now Zagreb, Croatia)
- Occupations: novelist, translator

August Harambašić (14 July 1861 – 16 July 1911) was a Croatian writer, poet, publisher, politician and translator.

Born in Donji Miholjac, he studied law in Vienna and Zagreb. Politically, he followed the sharp line of Ante Starčević's Croatian Party of Rights, which landed him in jail several times. He was a representative in the Sabor from 1901. He was an editor and reporter for various periodicals. He died in Zagreb.

Harambašić translated various books of famous authors into Croatian.

== See also ==
- Lavoslav Vukelić
