= Lika (river) =

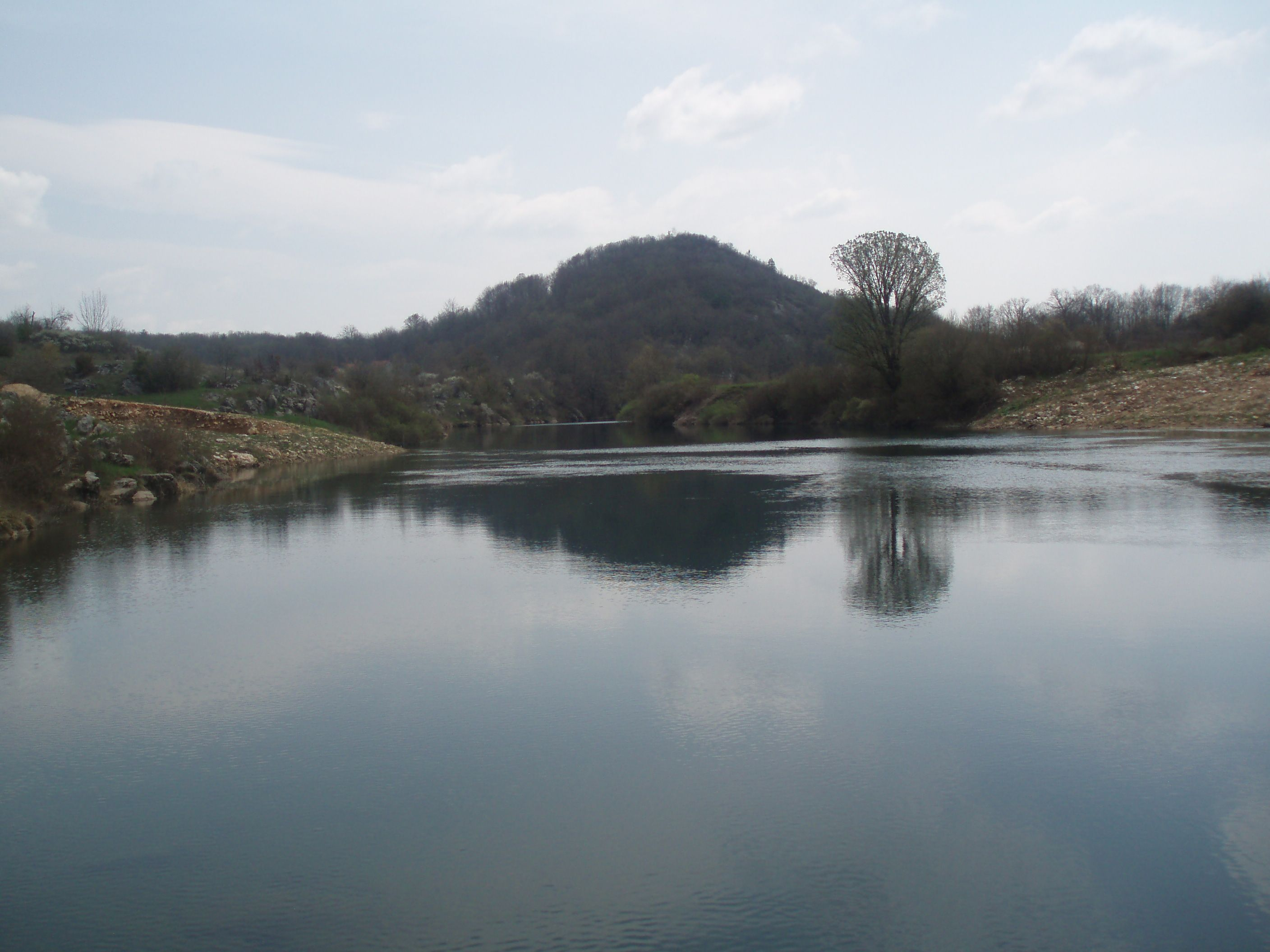
- Lika River, near Kosinj

Location
- Country: Croatia

Physical characteristics
- Source
  - location: Velebit Mountains
  - elevation: 600 m (2,000 ft)
- Mouth
  - location: ponor
  - coordinates: 44°46′N 15°10′E
  - elevation: 480 m (1,570 ft)
- Length: 77 km (48 mi)
- Basin size: 1,014 km^{2} (392 sq mi)
- Discharge
  - average: 7.33 m^{3}/s (259 cu ft/s)

The Lika is a river in Croatia which gives its name to the Lika region. It is 77 kilometres (48 mi) long and it has a basin with an area of 1,014 square kilometres (392 sq mi). Its average discharge at the measurement station in Bilaj (covering 225 km^{2} of the basin) is 7.33 m^{3}/s, and it can go completely dry.

It is known as a sinking river because at the end of its course, it flows into a series of ponors or swallow-holes and disappears from the surface. The Lika River rises near the village of Kukljić at the foot of the Velebit Mountains, flows in a northwesterly direction past the town of Gospić, enters and leaves Lake Krušćica, and continues to the northwest until it sinks into the karst topography at ponors near Lipovo Polje.

== Etymology and names ==
The name is mostly likely to derive from the Proto-Indo European root *u̯leiku̯- ‘to be(come) moist, to moisten’.
