= Molden (surname) =

Molden is a surname. Notable people with the surname include:

- Berthold Molden, née Moldauer (1853, Bielitz – 1942, Vienna), Austrian journalist
- Alex Molden (born 1973), American football player
- Antwaun Molden (born 1985), American football player
- Elijah Molden (born 1999), American football player
- Ernst Molden (1886, Vienna – 1953), Austrian journalist and historian, son of Berthold
- Etu Molden (born 1979), American football player
- Frank Molden (1942–2023), American football player
- Otto Molden (1918, Vienna – 2002), Austrian publicist
