= National anthem of Austria =

Bundeshymne der Republik Österreich
English: National Anthem of the Republic of Austria
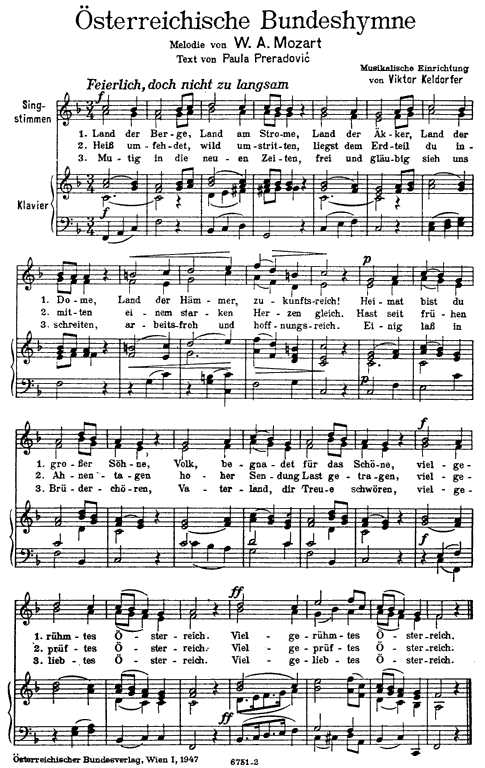
- Sheet music of the Austrian national anthem from 1947, citing Wolfgang Amadeus Mozart as the composer and utilizing the pre-2011 lyrics.
- National anthem of Austria
- Also known as: Land der Berge, Land am Strome (English: 'Land of the Peaks, Land by the Stream')
- Lyrics: Paula von Preradović, 1947 (modified in 2012)
- Music: Wolfgang Amadeus Mozart and/or Johann Holzer (disputed), 1791
- Adopted: 1946 (as instrumental); 1947 (with lyrics)
- Preceded by: "Sei gesegnet ohne Ende" (as independent Austria) "Deutschlandlied" and "Horst-Wessel-Lied" (as part of Germany)

Audio sample
- U.S. Navy Band instrumental rendition in F major: file; help

The National Anthem of Austria (Austrian German: Bundeshymne der Republik Österreich, lit. 'Federal Anthem of the Republic of Austria'), also known by its incipit "Land der Berge, Land am Strome" (pronounced [lant deːɐ̯ ˈbɛʁɡə lant ʔam ˈʃtʁoːmə]; 'Land of the Peaks, Land by the Stream'), was adopted without lyrics in 1946. The melody, which at that time was incorrectly attributed to Wolfgang Amadeus Mozart, was matched with a text by Paula von Preradović the following year.

The melody's origin is not definitively known, and over time several possible composers have been suggested; today it is usually attributed to either Johann Holzer or Paul Wranitzky.

== History ==
Nineteen days before his death on 5 December 1791, Wolfgang Amadeus Mozart composed his last complete work, the Freimaurerkantate, K. 623. In parts of the printed edition of this cantata there appeared the song K. 623a "Lasst uns mit geschlungnen Händen" ("Let us with joined hands"). To this melody the Austrian national anthem is sung. Today, claims of Mozart's authorship are regarded as dubious among scholars and the song is attributed to Johann Holzer (either solely or co-authored with Mozart) or Paul Wranitzky.

Before the World War II Anschluss, Austria's state anthem was "Sei gesegnet ohne Ende", set to the tune of Haydn's "Gott erhalte Franz den Kaiser", the state anthem of imperial Austria since 1797. The current German national anthem "Deutschlandlied" uses the same tune, but with different words (it was also the co-national anthem of Germany during National Socialist rule). To avoid the association, and because singing it was banned for a time after the war, a new state anthem was created. The lyrics were written by Paula von Preradović. On 22 October 1946, the song was officially declared Austria's national anthem, albeit without words. Lyrics were added in February 1947. On 1 January 2012, parts of the lyrics were changed to make the composition gender-neutral.

=== Attempts at gender-neutral language ===
Since the 1990s, several attempts have been made to modify the lyrics to use more gender-neutral language. In 2005, Women's Minister Maria Rauch-Kallat of the Austrian People's Party (ÖVP) stated her objection to the words sons, fraternal and fatherland in the lyrics and proposed changes. Her proposal met strong resistance by Austria's largest newspaper, the Kronen Zeitung, and failed to gain support from the then coalition partner, the Alliance for the Future of Austria (BZÖ).

In January 2010, Austrian pop singer Christina Stürmer presented a pop rock version of the hymn "Heimat bist du großer Söhne und Töchter" ('Thou art home to great sons and daughters') as part of a campaign by the Austrian federal ministry of education. She was sued for violation of copyright by the estate of Paula von Preradović but subsequently cleared by the Austrian Supreme Court of Justice who called it "a mere modernisation" and allowed the version to stand.

Since 1 January 2012, a few words in the state anthem are different from before. The text and notes of the state anthem were officially codified in the Federal Act of the National Anthem of the Republic of Austria.

== Lyrics ==
Only the first verse is considered official and performed during official events.

German original

Land der Berge, Land am Strome,
Land der Äcker, Land der Dome,
Land der Hämmer, zukunftsreich!
Heimat großer Töchter und Söhne, (Note: Pre-2012: Heimat bist du großer Söhne ('Thou art home to great sons').)
Volk, begnadet für das Schöne,
𝄆 Vielgerühmtes Österreich! 𝄇

Heiß umfehdet, wild umstritten,
Liegst dem Erdteil du inmitten
Einem starken Herzen gleich.
Hast seit frühen Ahnentagen
Hoher Sendung Last getragen,
𝄆 Vielgeprüftes Österreich. 𝄇

Mutig in die neuen Zeiten,
Frei und gläubig sieh uns schreiten,
Arbeitsfroh und hoffnungsreich.
Einig laß in Jubelchören, (Note: Pre-2012: Einig laß in Brüderchören ('Let us [swear loyalty] united in brother's choirs').)
Vaterland, dir Treue schwören.
𝄆 Vielgeliebtes Österreich. 𝄇

IPA transcription (Note: See Help:IPA/German, German phonology and Austrian German.)

[ˈlant dɛɐ ˈbɛɐ.gə lant am ˈʃtroː.mə |]
[lant dɛɐ ˈɛ.kɐ lant dɛɐ ˈdoː.mə ‖]
[lant dɛɐ ˈhɛ.mɐ ˈt͡suː.kʊɱft͡s.ˌraɪç |]
[ˈhaɪ.mat ˈgroː.sɐ ˈtœx.tɐ ʊnt søː.nə ‖]
[fɔlk bə.ˈgnaː.dət fyːɐ das ˈʃøː.nə |]
𝄆 [ˈfiːl.gə.ˌryːm.təs ˈøː.stɐ.ˌraɪç ‖] 𝄇

[haɪs ʊɱ.ˈfeː.dət vɪlt ʊm.ˈstriː.tn̩ |]
[ˈliːkst deːm ˈeːɐ.taɪl dʊ ˈiːn.mɪ.tn̩ ‖]
[ˈaɪ.nəm ˈʃtar.kn̩ ˈhɛɐ.t͡sn̩ ˈglaɪç |]
[hast saɪt ˈfryː.ən ˈaː.nən.ˌtaː.gən ‖]
[ˈhoː.ɛɐ ˈsɛn.dʊŋ last gə.ˈtraː.gən |]
𝄆 [ˈfiːl.gə.ˌpryːf.təs ˈøː.stɐ.ˌraɪç ‖] 𝄇

[ˈmuː.tɪk iːn diː ˈnoʏ.ən ˈt͡saɪ.tn̩ |]
[fraɪ ʊnt ˈgloʏ.bɪk siː ʊns ˈʃraɪ.tn̩ ‖]
[ˈar.baɪt͡s.ˌfroː ʊnt ˈhɔf.nʊŋs.ˌraɪç |]
[ˈaɪ.nɪk las iːn ˈjuː.bəl.ˌkøː.rən ‖]
[ˈfaː.tɐ.ˌlant diːɐ ˈtroʏ.ə ˈʃvøː.rən |]
𝄆 [ˈfiːl.gə.ˌliːp.təs ˈøː.stɐ.ˌraɪç ‖] 𝄇

English translation

Land of mountains, land on the river,
Land of fields, land of cathedrals,
Land of hammers, rich in the future!
Home of great daughters and sons,
People gifted for beauty,
𝄆 Much-praised Austria! 𝄇

Hotly contested, fiercely disputed,
You lie at the heart of the continent
Like a strong heart.
Since early ancestral days,
You have borne the burden of a noble mission,
𝄆 Much-tested Austria. 𝄇

Courageously into the new times,
Free and faithful, see us stride,
Joyful to work and full of hope.
United in jubilant choirs,
Fatherland, let us swear allegiance to you.
𝄆 Much-beloved Austria! 𝄇

=== Slovene verse ===
A Slovene-language version of the third verse was written for the Carinthian Slovenes of Carinthia. It was translated from the pre-2012 German version of the third verse.

Hrabro v novi čas stopimo,
prosto, verno, glej, hodimo;
upa polni, delavni.
Bratski zbor prisega hkrati,
domovini zvestobo dati.
𝄆 Ljubljena nam Avstrija. 𝄇

== Parodies ==
=== Otto and Fritz Molden ===
The same evening after von Preradović learned that her lyrics were chosen for the national anthem, her sons Otto and Fritz Molden composed a satirical version of them.

Land der Erbsen, Land der Bohnen,
Land der vier Besatzungszonen,
Wir verkaufen dich im Schleich!
Und droben überm Hermannskogel
Flattert froh der Bundesvogel.
Vielgeliebtes Österreich!

Land of the peas, land of the beans,
Land of the four zones of occupation,
we sell thee on the black market!
And up there over the Hermannskogel
gladly the federal bird flutters.
Much beloved Austria!

According to media researcher Peter Diem, the first two of these lines were popular in the schools of Vienna in 1955.

=== Drahdiwaberl ===
In 1979, the music group Drahdiwaberl released their parody of "Land der Berge, Land am Strone", titled "Kaiserhymne / Pink Punk Shirt". The following text is modeled after von Preradović's lyrics and sung to the same tune.

Land der Äcker, Land der Dome
Land am Strom ohne Atome,
Land der Titel und Diplome

Heimat bist du großer Söhne
Heimat bist du großer Töchter
Zusatzvers der Frauenrechtler

Land der unmöglich begrenzten,
Land der Berg’, der allerschensten,
Land der Seen und Lipizzaner,
Der Prohaskas und des Klammer

Land der Krone, Land des Staberl
Land der Gruppe Drahdiwaberl.

Land of the fields, land of cathedrals
Land of non-nuclear energy,
Land of titles and diplomas

Home thou art of great sons
Home thou art of great daughters
Additional verse from feminists

Land of the impossibly limited,
Land of the peaks, the most beautiful,
Land of lakes and Lipizzians,
Of Prohaska and Klammer

Land of the crown, land of Staberl
Land of the Drahdiwaberl group.

=== Rotzpipn ===
In 2012, the Viennese band Rotzpipn won the 9th protest song contest with their "Hymne 2.0". The jury included Ernst Molden, grandson of Paula von Preradović, who gave the group the highest score.
