= Velina Tchakarova =

Austrian-Bulgarian political scientist

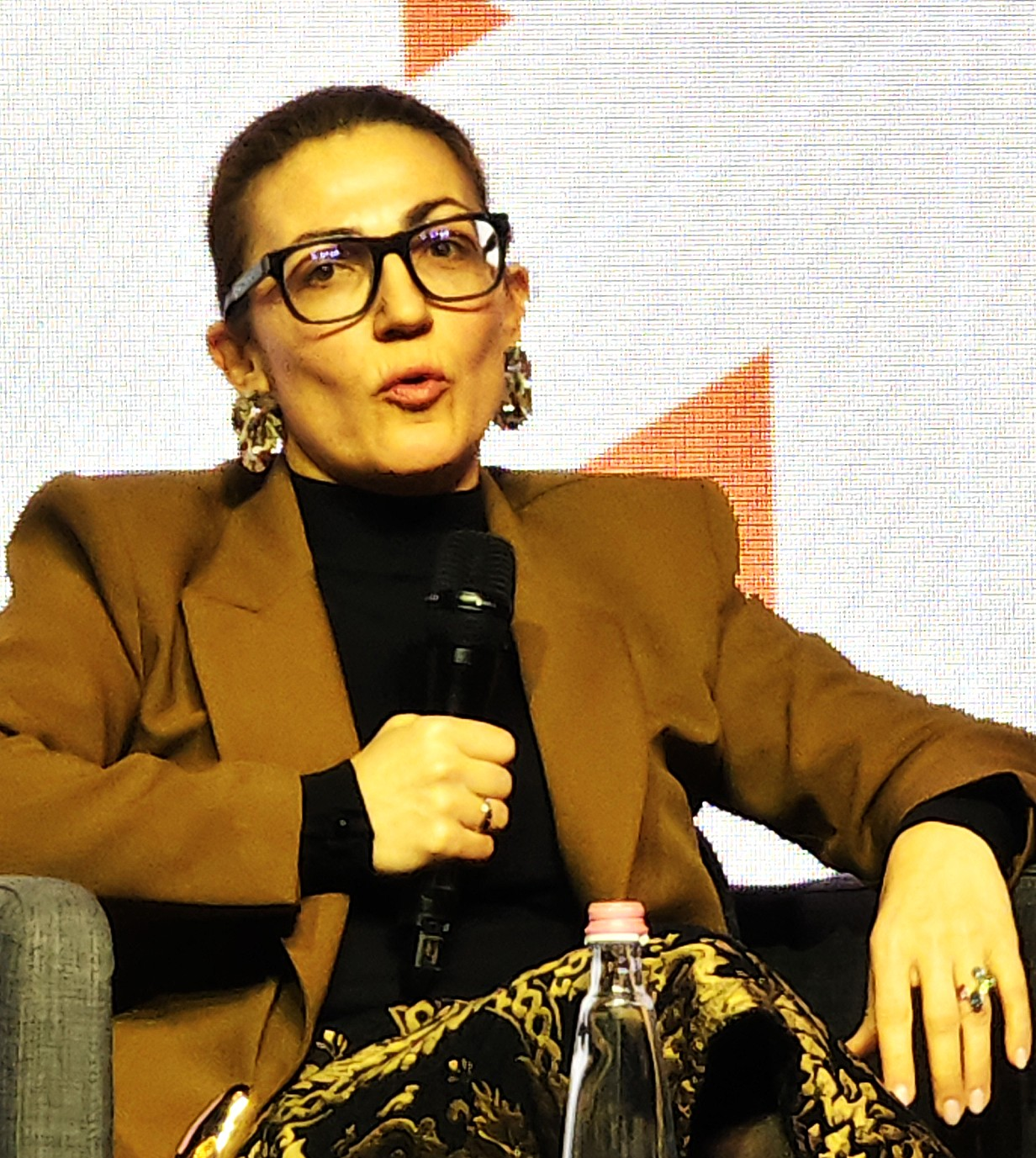
- Born: July 16, 1979 (age 47); Sofia, Bulgaria
- Education: University of National and World Economy; Heidelberg University
- Occupations: Geopolitical strategist, political scientist
- Organization: FACE – For A Conscious Experience
- Known for: Dragonbear concept

Velina Tchakarova (born 16 July 1979) is an Austrian-Bulgarian geopolitical strategist and political scientist. She is the founder of the consultancy FACE – For A Conscious Experience and former director of the Austrian Institute for European and Security Policy (AIES) in Vienna. Her work focuses on strategic geopolitics, global system transformation, and European security and energy policy.

== Early life and education ==
Tchakarova was born in Sofia, Bulgaria. She attended the German-language Galabov Gymnasium, completing both the Bulgarian Matura and the German Abitur. She studied macroeconomics and international relations at the University of National and World Economy in Sofia, graduating with a bachelor's degree in 2003. She later obtained a master's degree in political science and South Asian studies at Heidelberg University in 2006.

== Career ==
Tchakarova began her career in research and advisory work on global system transformation and the geostrategy of major powers. She joined the Austrian Institute for European and Security Policy (AIES) in Vienna, where she became director in 2018. She held this position until early 2023, advising Austrian and European institutions on issues including EU policy in Eastern Europe, Russia’s war in Ukraine, and global power shifts.

In 2023, Tchakarova founded FACE – For A Conscious Experience, a geopolitical consultancy based in Austria that provides strategic foresight, scenario planning, and risk analysis. She is a member of the Strategic and Security Policy Advisory Board of the Austrian Federal Ministry of Defense, the Scientific Advisory Board of the European Forum Alpbach, and the Paris-based think tank Eastern Circles. She also lectures at the Real-World Risk Institute directed by Nassim Nicholas Taleb and serves on the peer board of the Defence Horizon Journal.

== Concepts ==
Tchakarova is known for coining the term Dragonbear to describe the strategic coordination between China (the "dragon") and Russia (the "bear"). She argues that this partnership is not a formal alliance but a pragmatic alignment of interests, enabling both powers to counterbalance Western influence. The concept has been cited in Austrian and international media as a framework for understanding the emerging multipolar order.

== Media reception ==
Tchakarova’s analyses have been widely cited in Austrian and international outlets. In Die Presse, she stated that "for the USA, China, not Russia, is the greater danger," highlighting Washington’s strategic focus on Beijing while warning of Europe’s dependency on both superpowers. In Der Standard, she explained that the Dragonbear partnership shields Russia from Western sanctions, describing it as a defining feature of the global order. In an interview with TVP World in 2025, she cautioned that "a ceasefire won’t stop Russia… we must prepare ourselves for the post-ceasefire period," stressing that Moscow would use any pause in fighting to regroup. In Conversations with Tyler, she predicted that China would not attack Taiwan in the near future and discussed potential Russian moves in the Baltics. Her commentary has also appeared in the South China Morning Post, where she analyzed systemic shifts affecting Asia and Europe.

== Selected works ==
Tchakarova has authored numerous policy papers and essays, including contributions to the AIES Policy Papers series and the Defence Horizon Journal. She has written extensively on the Dragonbear concept, the EU’s strategic positioning in Eastern Europe, and the global implications of Russia’s war in Ukraine. Her articles in the South China Morning Post and interviews in Austrian media have further disseminated her views internationally.

== See also ==
- China–Russia relations
