= Pervenci =

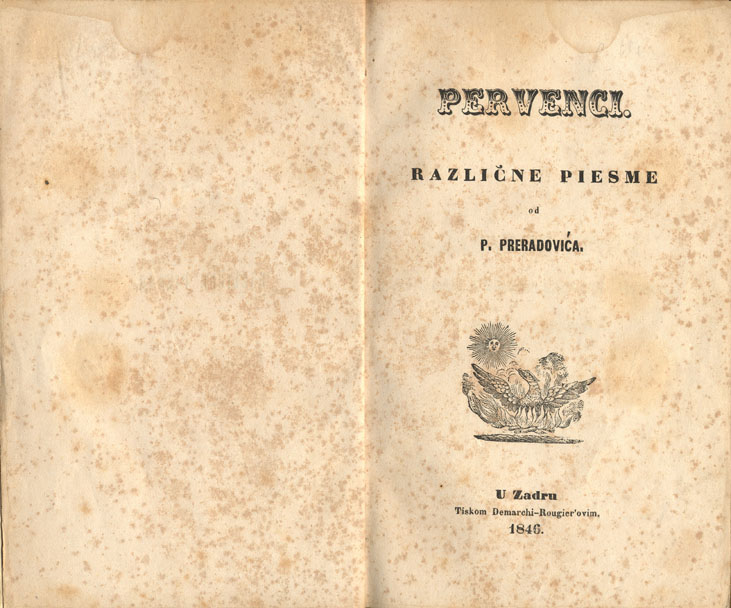
- Author: Petar Preradović
- Original title: Pervenci: Različne piesme
- Language: Croatian
- Genre: Poetry
- Publication date: 1846

Pervenci (English: Premières), subtitled različne piesme, is a collection of 35 poems written by Croatian poet Petar Preradović in his first poetry collection.. They were first published in 1846 in Zadar.

The book is composed in three sections; Cvietje, Bilje and Presad!.
