= Paula von Preradović =

Austrian writer and poet (1887–1951)

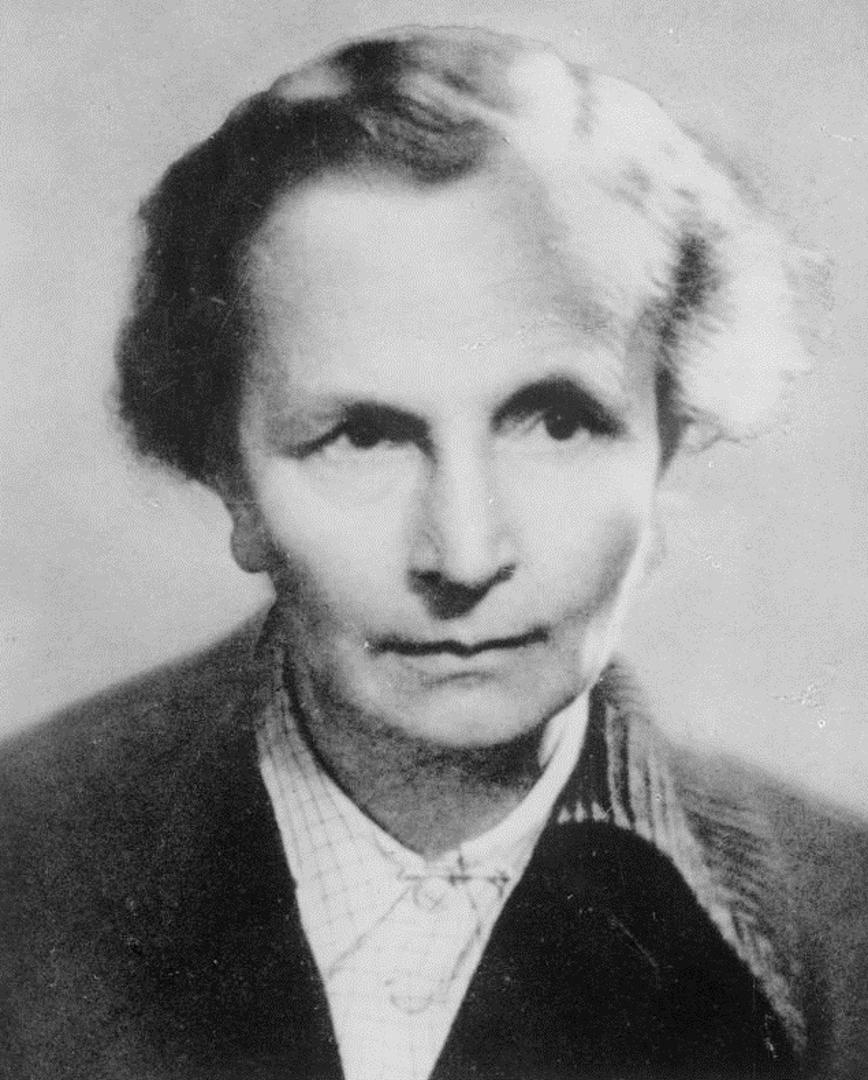
Paula Preradovic.

Paula Preradović (German: [ˈpaʊ̯la fɔn ˈpreːradɔvɪtʃ]; 12 October 1887 – 25 May 1951), known professionally as Paula von Preradović or by her married name as Paula Molden, was an Austrian writer and poet of Croatian descent.

She was the granddaughter of the Croatian poet, writer and military general Petar Preradović. Paula Preradović was born in Vienna, but her family moved to Pula, Istria, in 1889. Later she lived in Copenhagen and again in Vienna. She was married to the journalist, diplomat and founder of the Austrian newspaper Die Presse, Ernst Molden, and had two sons, the publicist and federalist Otto Molden (1918–2002), and the journalist Fritz Molden (1924–2014).

She composed the lyrics for the national anthem of Austria, "Land der Berge, Land am Strome", in 1947; Preradović is one of the few women to have composed such an anthem.

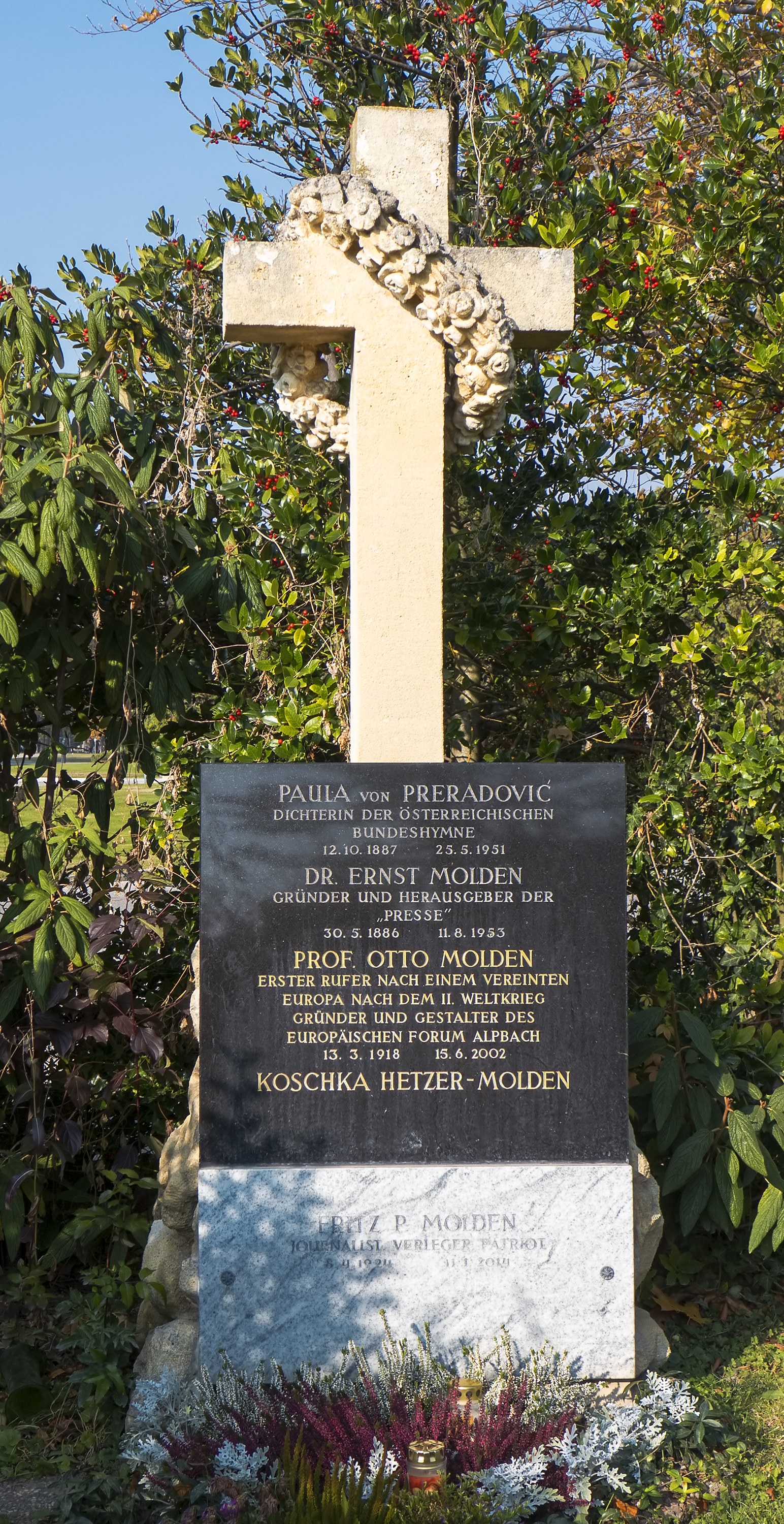
Grave of Preradović and Molden

Preradović died in Vienna in 1951 and is buried at the Zentralfriedhof.

== Works ==
Poetry

- Dalmatinische Sonette, 1933
- Lob Gottes im Gebirge, 1936
- Ritter, Tod und Teufel, 1946

Prose

- Pave und Pero, 1940
- Königslegende, 1950
- Die Versuchung des Columba, 1951
- Wiener Chronik, 1945, her diary which was published only in 1995
