= Stari Gradac =

Coordinates: 45°55′N 17°17′E

- Village
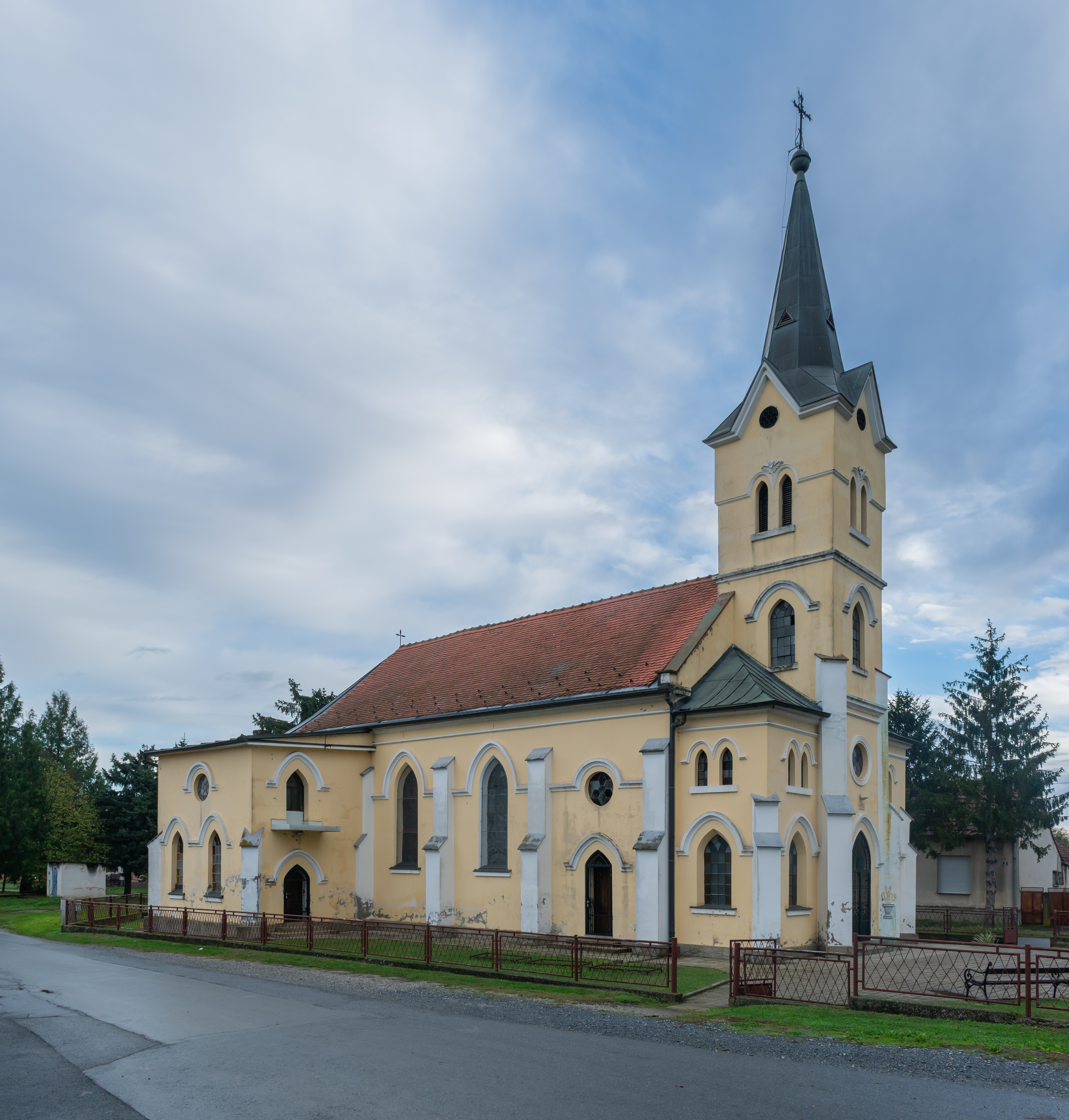
- Saints Peter and Paul church in Stari Gradac
- Interactive map of Stari Gradac
- Country: Croatia
- County: Virovitica-Podravina County
- Municipality: Pitomača

Area
  - Total: 14.3 km^{2} (5.5 sq mi)

Population (2021)
  - Total: 537
  - Density: 37.6/km^{2} (97.3/sq mi)
- Time zone: UTC+1 (CET)
  - Summer (DST): UTC+2 (CEST)

Stari Gradac is a village in Croatia. It is connected by the D2 highway.
