= Velika Črešnjevica =

- Village
- Location within Croatia
- Coordinates: 45°54′0″N 17°11′0″E
- Country: Croatia
- County: Virovitica-Podravina County
- Municipality: Pitomača

Area
  - Total: 5.3 sq mi (13.8 km^{2})
- Elevation: 466 ft (142 m)

Population (2021)
  - Total: 385
  - Density: 72.3/sq mi (27.9/km^{2})
- Time zone: UTC+1 (CET)
  - Summer (DST): UTC+2 (CEST)
- Postal Code: 33405 Pitomača
- Area code: (+385) 33

Velika Črešnjevica is a village in Croatia.
