= Grabrovnica =

Coordinates: 45°56′N 17°10′E

- Village
- Interactive map of Grabrovnica
- Country: Croatia
- Region: Podravina
- County: Virovitica-Podravina County
- Municipality: Pitomača

Area
  - Total: 7.5 km^{2} (2.9 sq mi)

Population (2021)
  - Total: 357
  - Density: 48/km^{2} (120/sq mi)
- Time zone: UTC+1 (CET)
  - Summer (DST): UTC+2 (CEST)

Grabrovnica is a village in Croatia located in the Pitomača municipality, Virovitica-Podravina County. The village is known as a birthplace of Croatian poet Petar Preradović (1818–1872). His birth house, built in 1775, was renovated in 1968 and 2019, and is open for visitors.

== Notable people ==
- Petar Preradović
