= Ivan Rendić =

Croatian sculptor (1849–1932)

- Ivan Rendić, Croatian sculptor
- Born: 27 August 1849; Imotski, Kingdom of Dalmatia, Austrian Empire
- Died: 29 June 1932 (aged 82); Split, Kingdom of Yugoslavia
- Education: Venice, Florence
- Known for: Sculpture
- Notable work: Andrija Medulić, Julije Klović, Krsto I Frankopan, Ivan Gundulić, Nikola Jurišić and August Šenoa at Zrinjevac park in Zagreb, as well as Petar Preradović, Andrija Kačić Miošić also in Zagreb, Ljudevit Gaj in Krapina etc.
- Movement: Realism

Ivan Rendić (27 August 1849 – 29 June 1932) was a Croatian sculptor.

== Biography ==
He began sculpting early on in life, thanks to the stoneworking tradition of the island of Brač, where he was raised. He finished arts school in Venice in 1871 and afterwards became a part of the Fiorentine sculpting atelier. Later he mostly lived and worked in Trieste where he made the bulk of his works. In Croatia, most of his works were displayed in Zagreb and Split.

He was the first famous and educated Croatian sculptor of Modern age. He worked in the Realist style with elements of naturalism, especially in finer details.

Rendić made around 200 statues. His most famous works were public monuments raised in honour of famous Croats which remain over all parts of Croatia, for example, his statues of Andrija Medulić, Julije Klović, Krsto I Frankopan, Ivan Gundulić, Nikola Jurišić and August Šenoa at Zrinjevac park in Zagreb, as well as Petar Preradović and Andrija Kačić Miošić also in Zagreb, Ljudevit Gaj in Krapina, and busts of Eugen Kumičić, emperor Franz Joseph I and others in Supetar.

From 1921 he lived in Supetar, where he attempted in vain to form a school of arts. He finished his life in poverty.

Because of its support to the Illyrian movement and unification of Dalmatia with the rest of Croatia, he was the target of attacks of Italianists and Italian expansionists, especially during his work in Trieste.

== Gallery ==
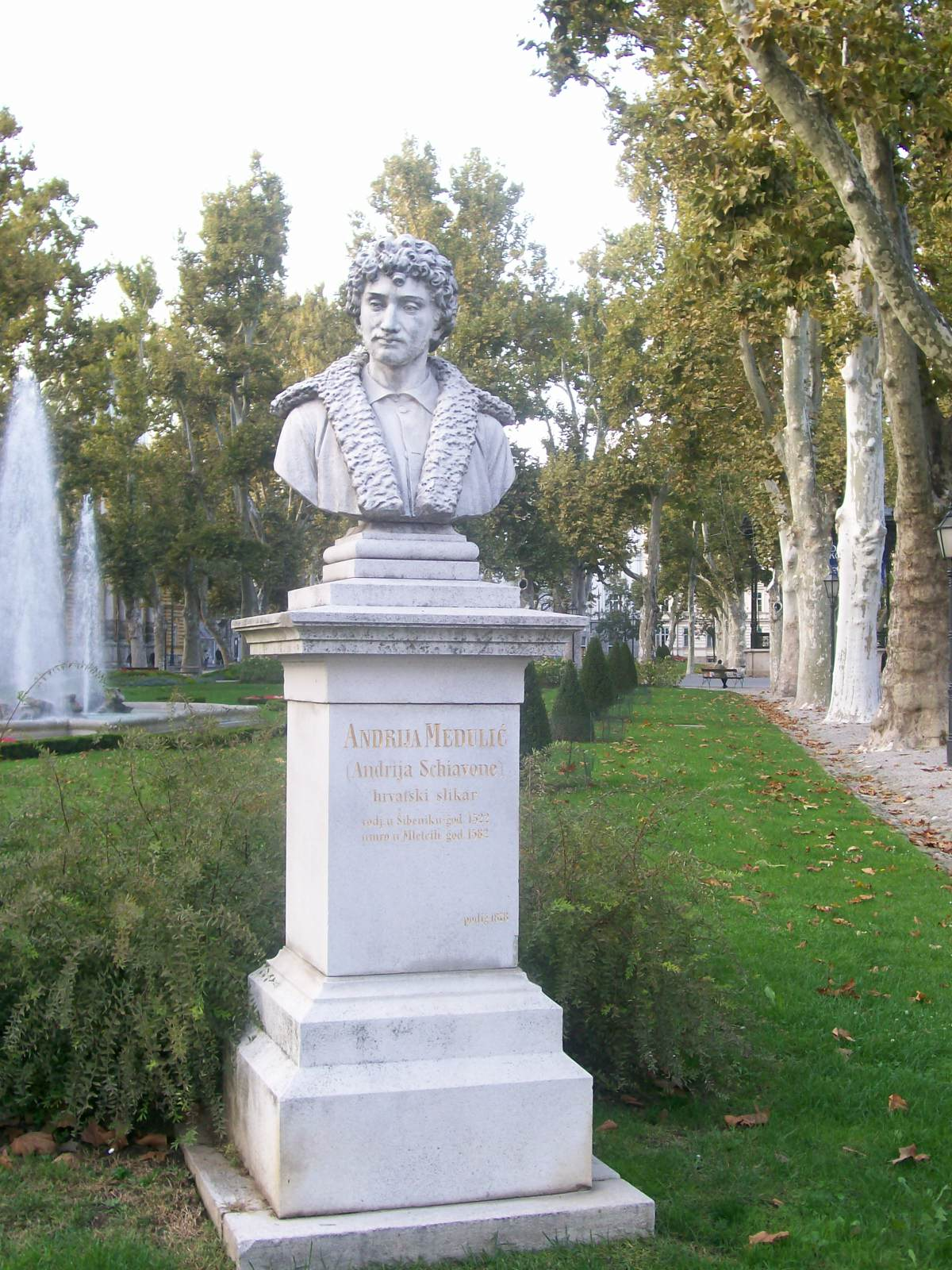
Andrija Medulić (Andrea Schiavone)

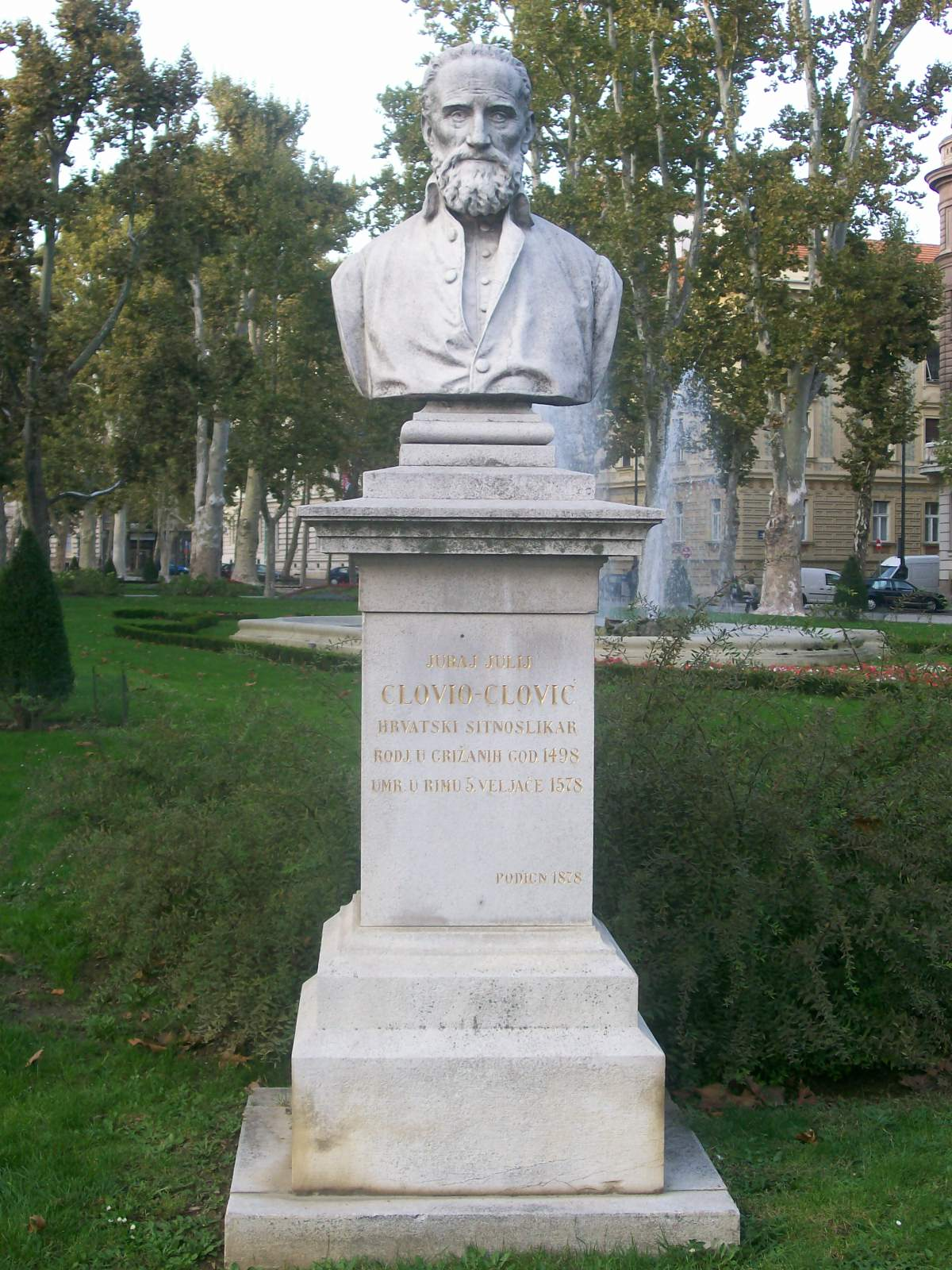
Julije Klović (Giulio Clovio)

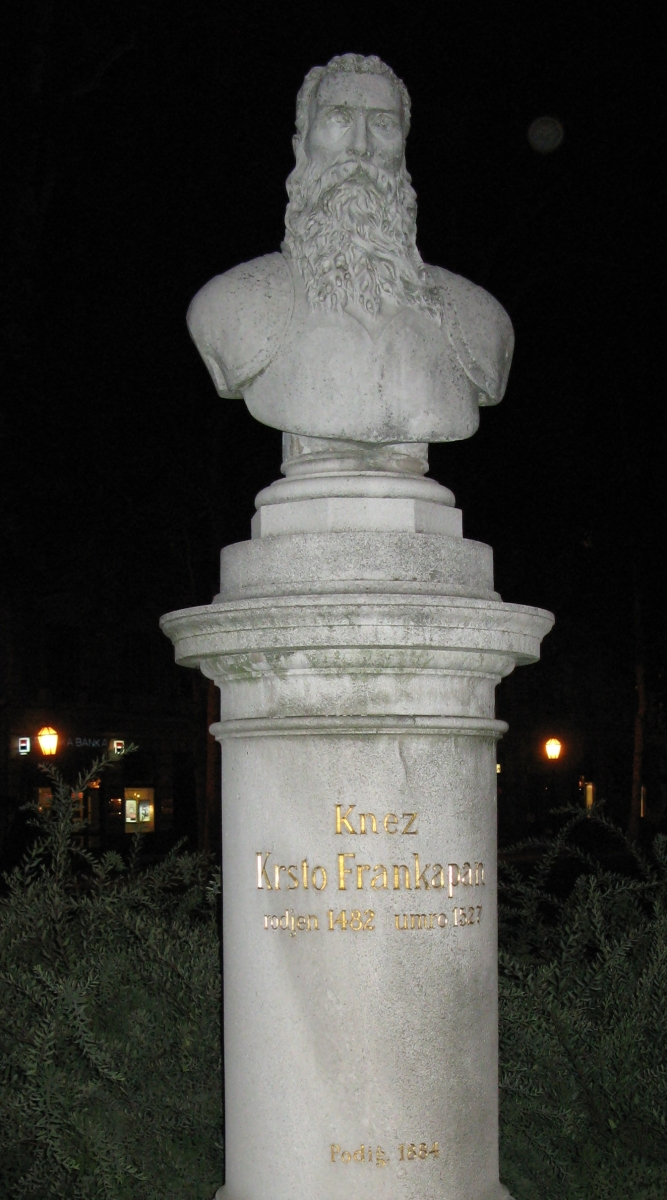
Prince Krsto I Frankopan

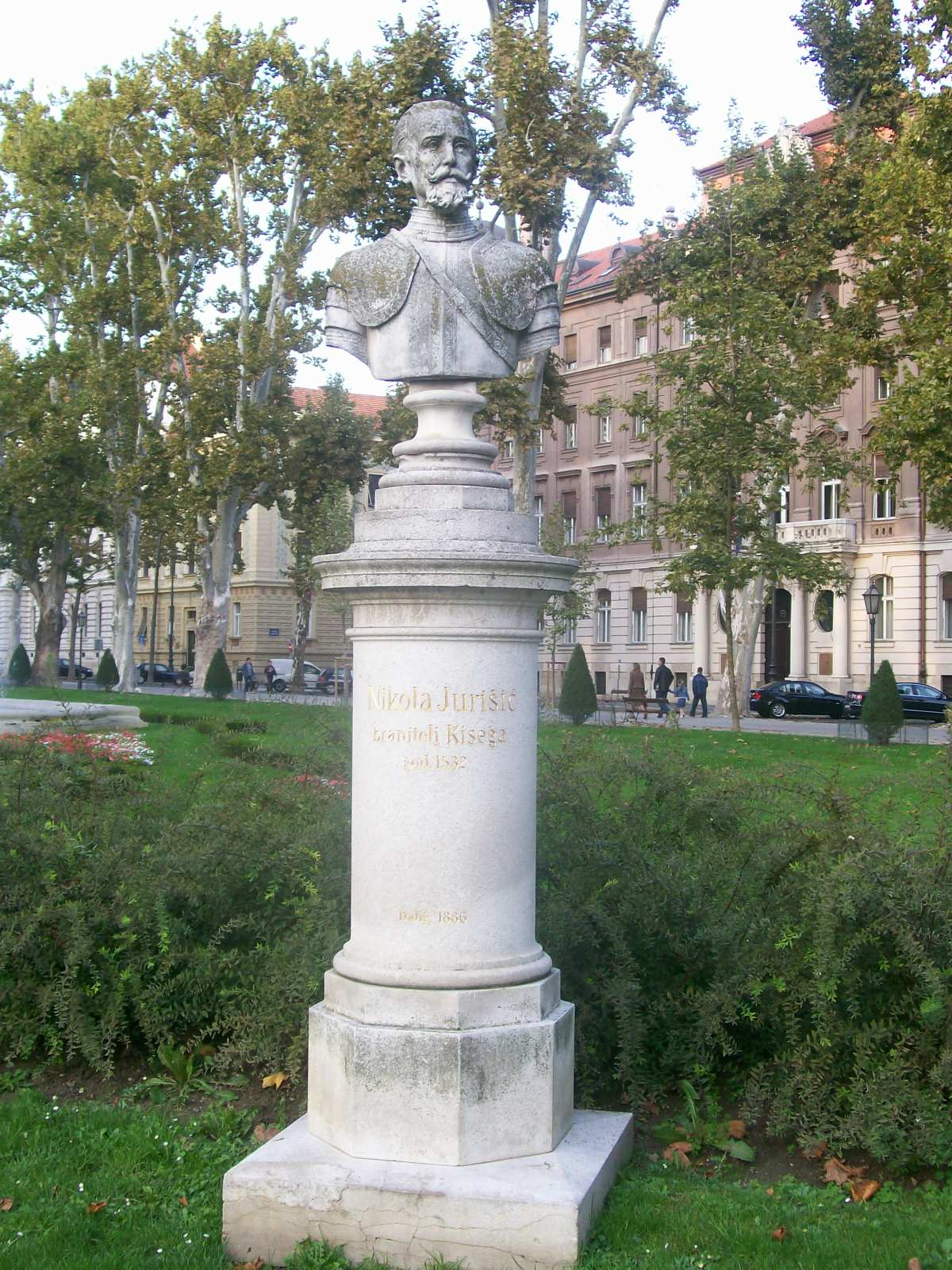
Nikola Jurišić

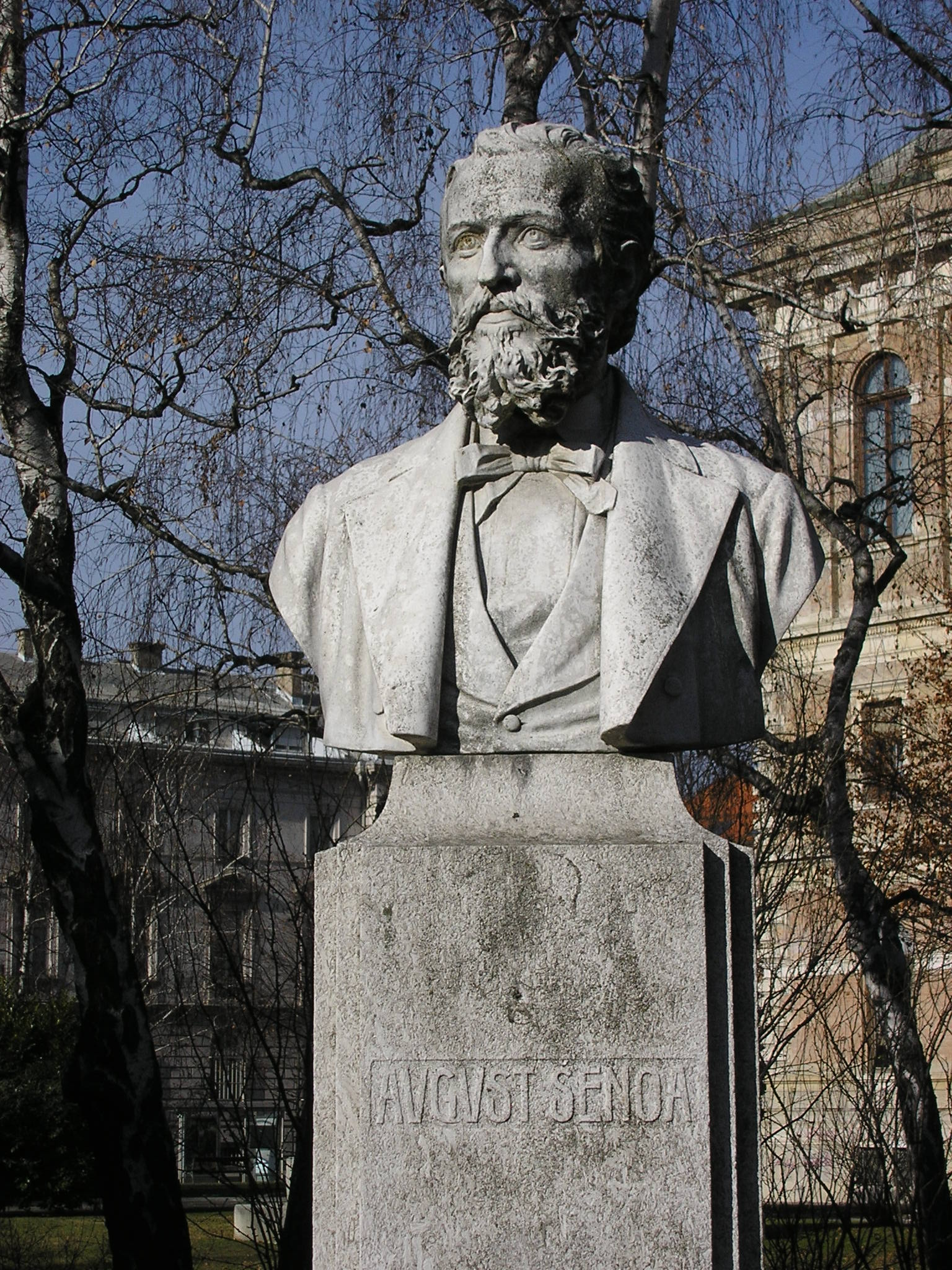
August Šenoa

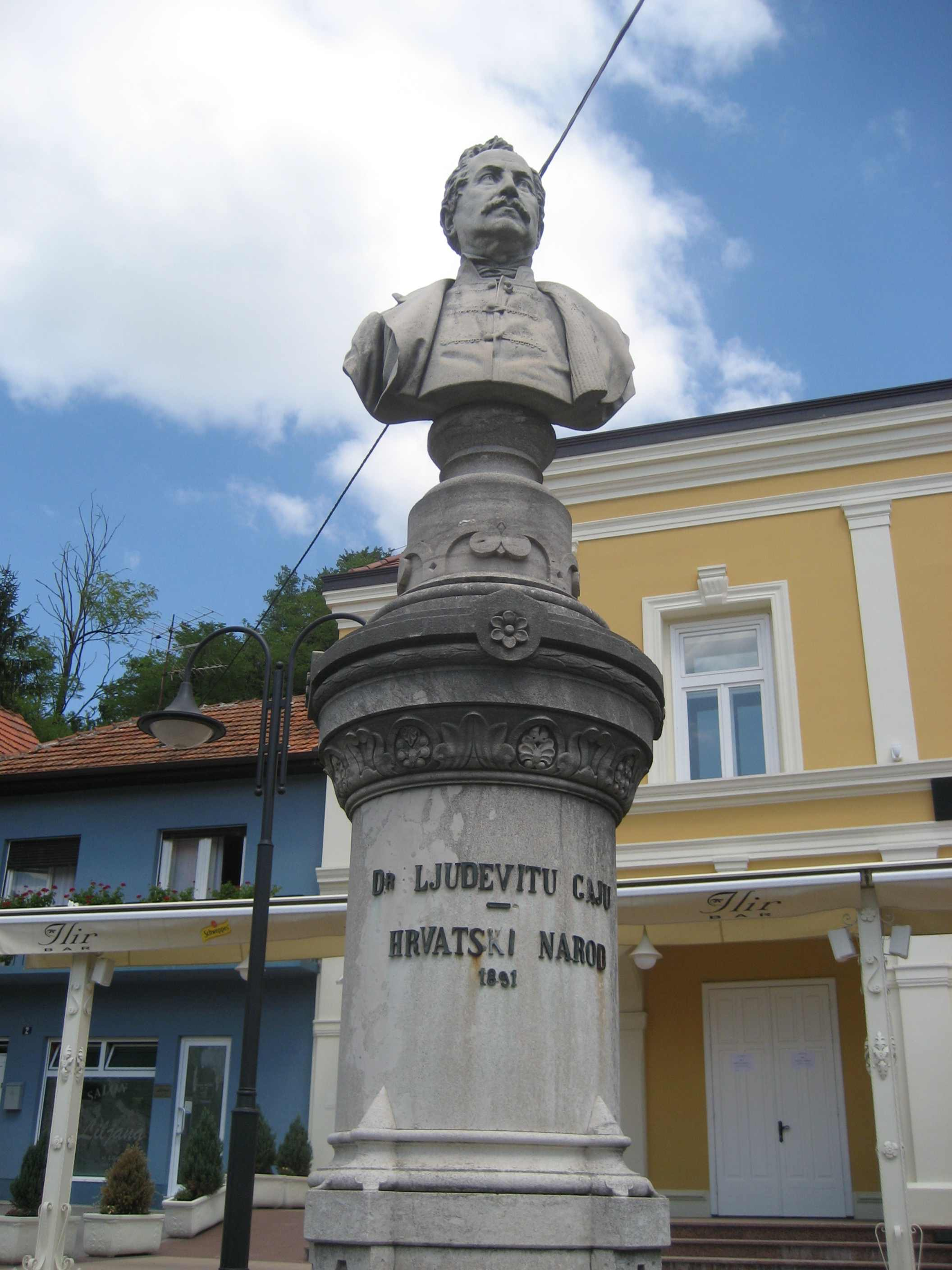
Ljudevit Gaj

== See also ==
- List of Croatian artists
- Realism (arts)
