= Otrovanec =

Coordinates: 45°55′37″N 17°12′35″E

- Interactive map of Otrovanec

Otrovanec is a village near Pitomača, Croatia. In the 2011 census, it had 624 inhabitants.
