= European Forum Alpbach =

Austrian nonprofit organisation and foundation

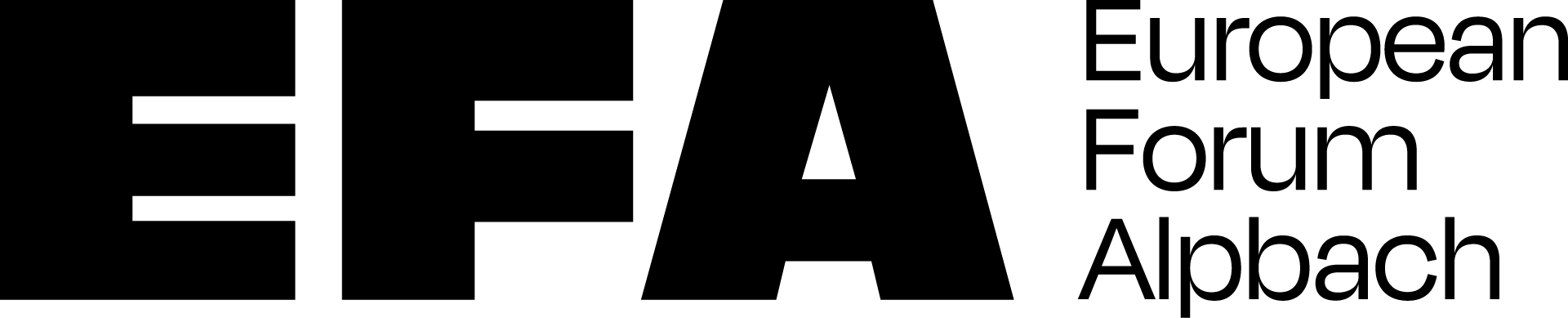

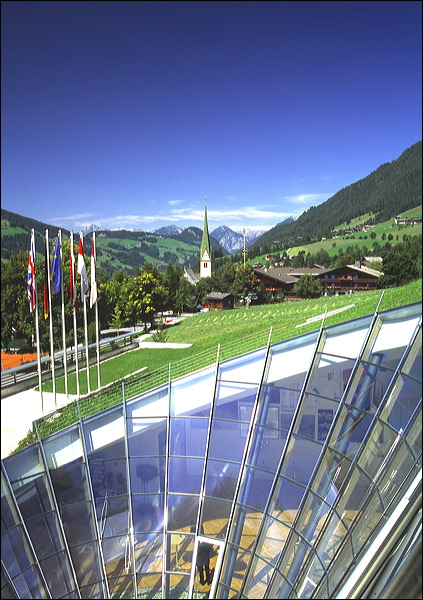
- Congress Center in Alpbach, Austria
- Formation: 1945; 80 years ago (as International College Weeks)
- Founder: Otto Molden, Simon Moser
- Type: Nonprofit organisation and Foundation
- Headquarters: Vienna, Austria
- Official language: English, German
- President: Othmar Karas
- Secretary General: Nikola Donig
- Key people: Antonella Mei-Pochtler; Peter Oberlechner; Christian Kern; Sabine Herlitschka; Winfried Kneip; Caroline Hornstein-Tomić; Klaus Welle; Marie Ringler; Harald Stankov-Schöny; Celina Moser
- Website: https://www.alpbach.org/

The European Forum Alpbach (EFA) is an Austrian nonprofit organisation and foundation based in Vienna, Austria. It is best known for hosting the event of the same name in the village of Alpbach. It is an interdisciplinary platform for science, politics, business and culture with its mission cited as "connecting international decision-makers from all sectors of society with an interested audience and committed young people".

== History ==
The forum was founded in 1945 as "International College Weeks" by Otto Molden, who had been active in the Austrian resistance movement, and Simon Moser. Nowadays, more than 4,000 people from over 70 countries accept the invitation to participate in the European Forum Alpbach each year. Participation is open to all interested parties. The events are held in the small village of Alpbach.

== Event programme ==
The event in August is divided into several main parts. As of 2024 the programme is centred around the following four thematic tracks:

- Climate
- Security
- Finance and Economy
- Democracy and the Rule of Law

The programme is structured in different modules. The Alpbach Seminars (formerly called Seminar Week) constitutes the core programme for scholarship holders. Alpbach in Motion is a three-days summit, being held also within the framework of the European Forum Alpbach. The event offers different formats – from seminars to workshop, hikes, discussion etc.

Accompanying the programme of the European Forum Alpbach throughout is a comprehensive schedule of arts and culture. In exhibitions, concerts and lectures, young artists in particular are offered the opportunity to present their work to the public. There are also the spontaneously organised fireside chats in which sensitive issues can be openly discussed with well-known personalities.

In past years, the programme also included other formats like symposia, a seminar week, Alpbach summer school courses or an Alpbach media academy.

== Presidents ==
- Otto Molden, 1945–1960, 1970–1992
- Heinrich Pfusterschmid-Hardtenstein, 1992–2000
- Erhard Busek, 2000–2012
- Franz Fischler, 2012–2020
- Andreas Treichl, 2020–2024
- Othmar Karas, 2024–

== Networks ==
=== Forum Alpbach Network (FAN) - Initiative groups and clubs ===
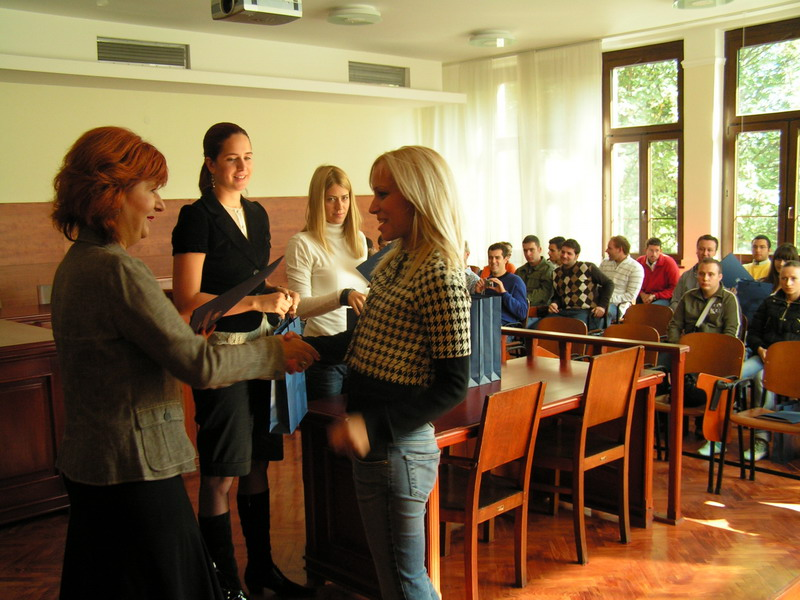
European Forum Alpbach at the Belgrade Law School (Serbia)

Former scholarship holders of the European Forum Alpbach founded initiative groups and clubs in more than 30 countries around the world (mostly in Central and Eastern Europe) in order to work together for the constant advancement of the forum. These groups and clubs promote the spirit of Alpbach in their home countries and universities and organise interdisciplinary events and lectures. They are considered to be sister organisations of the forum and most of them are giving out annual scholarships for students, young professionals, and change-makers to attend the European Forum Alpbach.

Among others, there are initiative groups in Armenia (Yerevan), Albania (Tirana), Austria (Graz, Linz and Vienna), Belgium (Brussels), Bosnia-Herzegovina (Sarajevo), Bulgaria (Sofia), France, Germany (Berlin and Cologne), Hungary (Budapest), Kosovo (Pristina), Macedonia (Skopje), Moldova (Chişinău), Montenegro (Podgorica), Poland (Warsaw), Serbia (Belgrade), Romania (Bucharest) and Ukraine (Kyiv, Lviv). Clubs exist in Austria (Burgenland, Lower Austria, Salzburg, Styria, Tyrol, Upper Austria, Vienna and Vorarlberg), Austria (Klagenfurt) / Italy / Slovenia (Senza Confini), Bulgaria, Croatia (Zagreb), Czech Republic, Greece, Italy (South Tyrol and Trentino), Liechtenstein, Middle East, Russia (Moscow), Serbia (Belgrade) and UK (London).

==== European elections 2024: Palumba ====
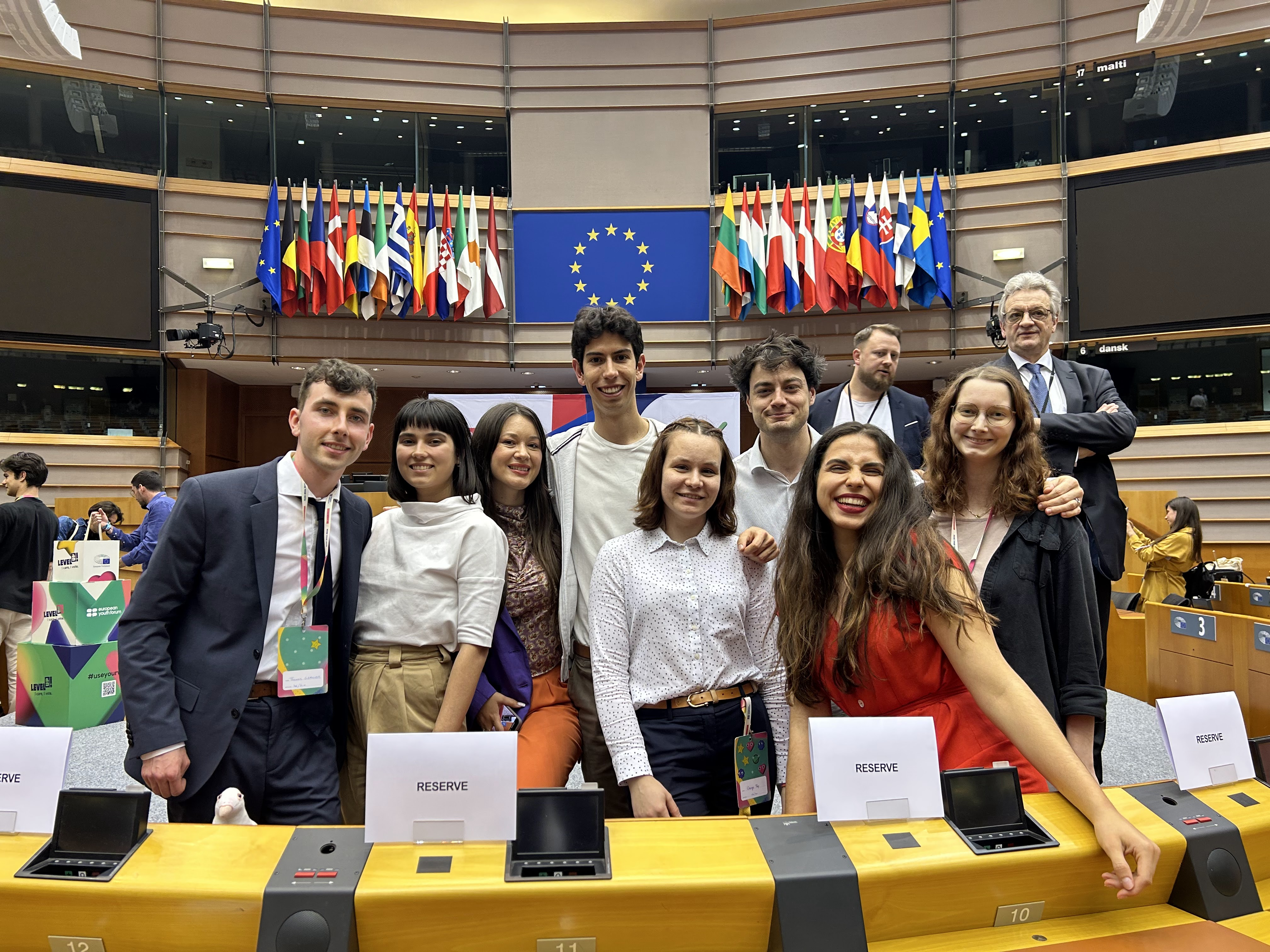
EFA alumni present the Palumba initiative to the European Parliament

In 2024, alumni from Club Alpbach France, Spain, and Belgium led a campaign to encourage young people to take part in the 2024 European Parliament elections. The Palumba initiative quickly became one of the most downloaded voting advice applications in Europe, with the aim of reducing abstention of young first-time voters.

The non-partisan initiative helped over 170,000 young voters in 27 countries and 22 languages, with the support of several European Union institutions, foundations and non-governmental organizations (Erasmus Student Network, Oxfam, European Youth Forum). On February 6, 2025, Palumba is announced as one of the 5 global winners in theYoung Innovators category of the World Summit Awards.

=== African Alpbach Network (AAN) ===
The African Alpbach Network was founded in 2019 and consists of more than 70 members from more than ten African countries.

=== Alpbach in Motion Alumni Club ===
Alpbach in Motion (AIM) is a three-day summit taking place during the European Forum Alpbach. The AIM programme connects up to 40 emerging leaders from various business backgrounds. It aims to encourage its participants to strengthen Europe by bringing change and new ways of acting into their industries and networks. Former participants of the programme founded an alumni club that exchanges and organises events on a regular basis.

== Past speakers ==
- Theodor W. Adorno
- Martti Ahtisaari
- Hans Albert
- Catherine Ashton
- Mark Bedau
- Ernst Bloch
- James M. Buchanan
- Ernst B. Chain
- Christo
- Ralf Dahrendorf
- Jamie Davies
- Jacques Delors
- Renato Dulbecco
- Friedrich Dürrenmatt
- John Carew Eccles
- Manfred Eigen
- Gottfried von Einem
- Amitai Etzioni
- Paul Feyerabend
- Indira Gandhi
- Theodor Geiger
- Neil Gershenfeld
- Alexander Halavais
- Friedrich von Hayek
- Werner Heisenberg
- Max Horkheimer
- Hans Kelsen
- Ban Ki-moon
- Václav Klaus
- Helmut Kohl
- Franz König
- Imre Lakatos
- Pascal Lamy
- Konrad Lorenz
- Fritz Machlup
- Herbert Marcuse
- Thomas Metzinger
- Jeff Moss
- Kumi Naidoo
- Viktor Orbán
- Zhong-Ren Peng
- Karl Popper
- Yitzhak Rabin
- Iveta Radičová
- Martin Rees
- José Ramos-Horta
- Mary Robinson
- Jeffrey Sachs
- Saskia Sassen
- Myron Scholes
- Erwin Schrödinger
- Richard Sennett
- Shi Yongxin
- Peter Sloterdijk
- Roger Y. Tsien
- Vaira Vike-Freiberga
- Ernst Florian Winter
- Fritz Wotruba
- Joseph Stiglitz
- Mairead McGuinness
- Justin Vivian Bond

== Critique ==
The EFA has been criticized for concealing its historical roots: As early as 1936, Simon Moser, co-founder of the forum and its scientific director until 1978, who was born in Jenbach, barely 20 kilometers from Alpbach, organized the first Austrian College Weeks on behalf of the Austrofascist corporative state. Journalist Markus Wilhelm comments: "In 1935, the Schuschnigg regime enacted the Higher Education Act, which also provided for college weeks for students. These were intended to serve the ideological indoctrination of young people, strengthen the national community in line with clerical-fascist guidelines, and contribute to the creation of the ′new Austrian people′. The first of these university camps took place in Rotholz near Jenbach."

Schuschnigg's authoritarian government had also appointed Moser, who was a chief officer of the Fatherland Front, as a "lecturer on ideological issues" at the University of Vienna. Similar to the National Socialist organization Strength Through Joy, the aim was to transform the "weak and pale city dwellers" in the Alpine villages into "strong, tanned figures". "This was to be achieved in the college camp through lectures on Austrian history, singing folk songs, and cultivating local customs, among other things. Of course, Dollfuss commemorations were also on the program.” After the Anschluss, Moser continued this jingoistic work in the form of photo books commissioned by the National Socialist Reich Labour Service and became a member of NSDAP on January 1, 1940 (membership number 7,886,075).

Wilhelm's assessment in 2015 was that "[...] today's major event is not a direct continuation of the corporative state's college weeks, but one should not pretend that a virgin birth took place in 1945."
