= Otto Molden =

Austrian publicist, federalist and author

Prof. Otto Molden (13 March 1918 – 15 June 2002) was an Austrian publicist, federalist and author of various books about European identity and history. He founded the European Forum Alpbach in 1945.

== Early life ==
Otto Molden was born in Vienna shortly before the end of World War I to Dr. Ernst Molden and Paula von Preradović, a poet and composer of Austria's national anthem. His father was a diplomat, writer, opponent to the Nazi regime and later on founder of the leading Austrian daily newspaper Die Presse. He is a great-grandson of Croatian poet, writer and military general Petar Preradović.

He deserted from the Wehrmacht in 1944 and was one of the founders of the Austrian Nazi resistance movement 05 before fleeing to Switzerland. After World War II, he studied history at the University of Vienna and wrote his PhD on the Austrian resistance movement during the German occupation.

== European Forum Alpbach ==
In 1945, together with Simon Moser, Otto Molden founded the European Forum Alpbach as an interdisciplinary forum where ideas for a peacefully united Europe were to be promoted and discussed. From 1945 to 1960 and from 1970 to 1992, Molden was president of the European Forum Alpbach. Nowadays, more than 3000 people from all over the world take part in the European Forum Alpbach per year.

== Federalist advocate ==
Politically, Molden was an active proponent for European integration and founded the Federalist International (FI) in 1959, which subsequently opened sections in Austria, Germany and Switzerland and other countries. He was also active in defending the independence of Taiwan by founding a Committee for Chinese-European Co-operation in the early 1970s. In the late 1990s Otto Molden reactivated the idea of a federalist European party by founding the European National Movement (ENM).

He died in Paphos, Cyprus in 2002.

== Bibliography ==
- Der Ruf des Gewissens. Der Österreichische Freiheitskampf 1938–1945. Beiträge zur Geschichte der Österreichischen Widerstandsbewegung. (Herold Verlag, 1958)
- Geist und Gesicht der Gegenwart: Gesehen durch das Spektrum Alpbach. (Europa Verlag, 1962)
- Zweikampf um das Gelbe Reich. Wer überlebt in Ostasien? (Molden Verlag, 1968)
- Der Mensch in der unvollkommenen Gesellschaft. (1980)
- Der andere Zauberberg: Das Phänomen Alpbach: Persönlichkeiten und Probleme Europas im Spiegelbild geistiger Auseinandersetzung. (Molden Verlag, 1981)
- Zu den Grenzen der Freiheit. Europäisches Forum Alpbach 1976. (Molden Verlag, 1982)
- Konflikt und Ordnung. Europäisches Forum Alpbach 1977. (Molden Verlag, 1982)
- Die Europäische Nation. Die neue Supermacht vom Atlantik bis zur Ukraine. (Herbig Verlag, 1990)
- Dialog Westeuropa - Lateinamerika. (Molden Verlag, 1992)
- Dialog Westeuropa - Schwarzafrika. (Molden Verlag, 1992)
- Odyssee meines Lebens und die Gründung Europas in Alpbach. (Amalthea, 2001)
