= Pitomača =

Municipality of Croatia

- Location within Croatia
- Coordinates: 45°57′02.16″N 17°13′45.84″E
- Country: Croatia
- County: Virovitica-Podravina County

Area
  - Total: 158.0 km^{2} (61.0 sq mi)

Population (2021)
  - Total: 8,402
  - Density: 53.18/km^{2} (137.7/sq mi)
- Time zone: UTC+1 (CET)
  - Summer (DST): UTC+2 (CEST)
- Website: pitomaca.hr

Pitomača is a village and a municipality in Croatia in the Virovitica–Podravina County.

In the 2011 census, it had a total population of 10,059, in the following settlements:

- Dinjevac, population 458
- Grabrovnica, population 405
- Kladare, population 467
- Križnica, population 128
- Mala Črešnjevica, population 199
- Otrovanec, population 624
- Pitomača, population 5,646
- Sedlarica, population 363
- Stari Gradac, population 674
- Starogradački Marof, population 247
- Turnašica, population 333
- Velika Črešnjevica, population 515

In the same census, 98.62% were Croats.

== History ==
Since the end of the Ottoman Empire until 1918, Pitomača (named PITOMACA before 1850) was part of the Austrian monarchy (Kingdom of Croatia-Slavonia after the compromise of 1867), in the Croatian Military Frontier, Warasdin-St. Georgener Regiment N°VI.
