= Ernst Molden =

Austrian journalist and historian

Ernst Hermann Wilhelm Molden (30 May 1886 – 11 August 1953) was an Austrian journalist and historian. An editor-in-chief of the Neue Freie Presse before WW2, he founded the Austrian daily newspaper Die Presse in 1946.

Born in Vienna, Ernst Molden was married to Paula von Preradović, a Croatian-Austrian poet who, in 1947, composed the lyrics for the national anthem of Austria. Their sons Otto and Fritz Molden participated in the Austrian resistance. He died in Vienna.
