= Pavao Miljavac =

Croatian soldier and politician (1953–2022)

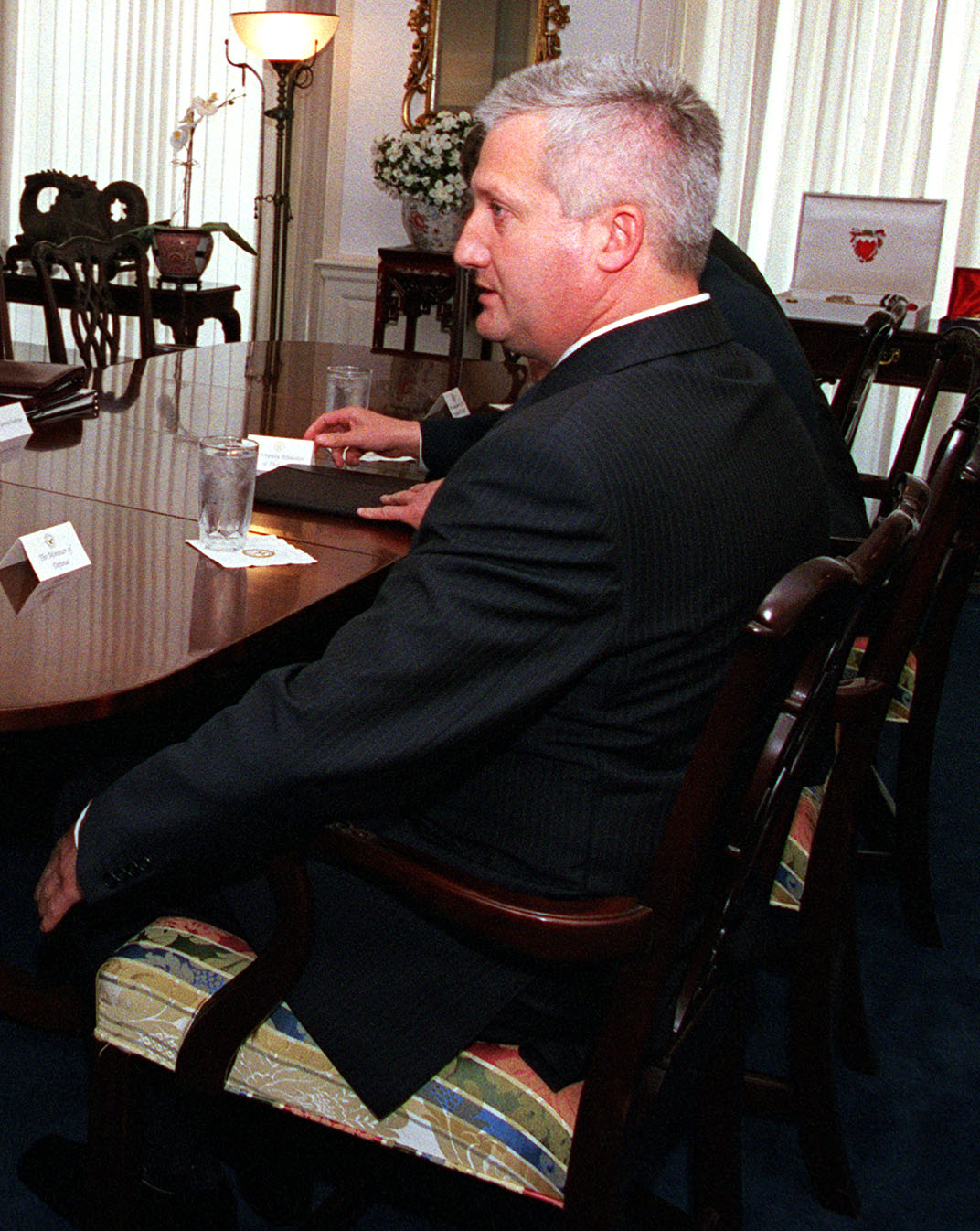
- Born: 3 April 1953; Maletići near Netretić, PR Croatia, FPR Yugoslavia
- Died: 6 December 2022 (aged 69); Zagreb, Croatia
- Military career
- Allegiance: Croatian Army
- Rank: General (General zbora)
- Commands: Chief of General Staff (1996–1998)

Pavao Miljavac (3 April 1953 – 6 December 2022) was a Croatian Army general.

He served as Chief of General Staff between 1996 and 1998, and between October 1998 and January 2000 he served as Croatia's Minister of Defence in the Cabinet of Zlatko Mateša, following Andrija Hebrang's resignation.

He ran in the January 2000 general election on the centre-right Croatian Democratic Union (HDZ) ticket, and won a seat in the Croatian Parliament. However, he left the party three months later and joined the newly established splinter party Democratic Centre in April 2000, along with other prominent HDZ members such as Vesna Škare-Ožbolt and Mate Granić.

Miljavac left politics after 2003. He owned a wood processing facility in Novigrad na Dobri.

Military offices
Preceded by Zvonimir Červenko	Chief of General Staff of the Armed Forces; 1996–1998	Succeeded by Davor Domazet-Lošo
Political offices
Preceded by Andrija Hebrang	Minister of Defence; 1998–2000	Succeeded by Jozo Radoš
