= Robert Hranj =

Croatian Admiral (born 1962)

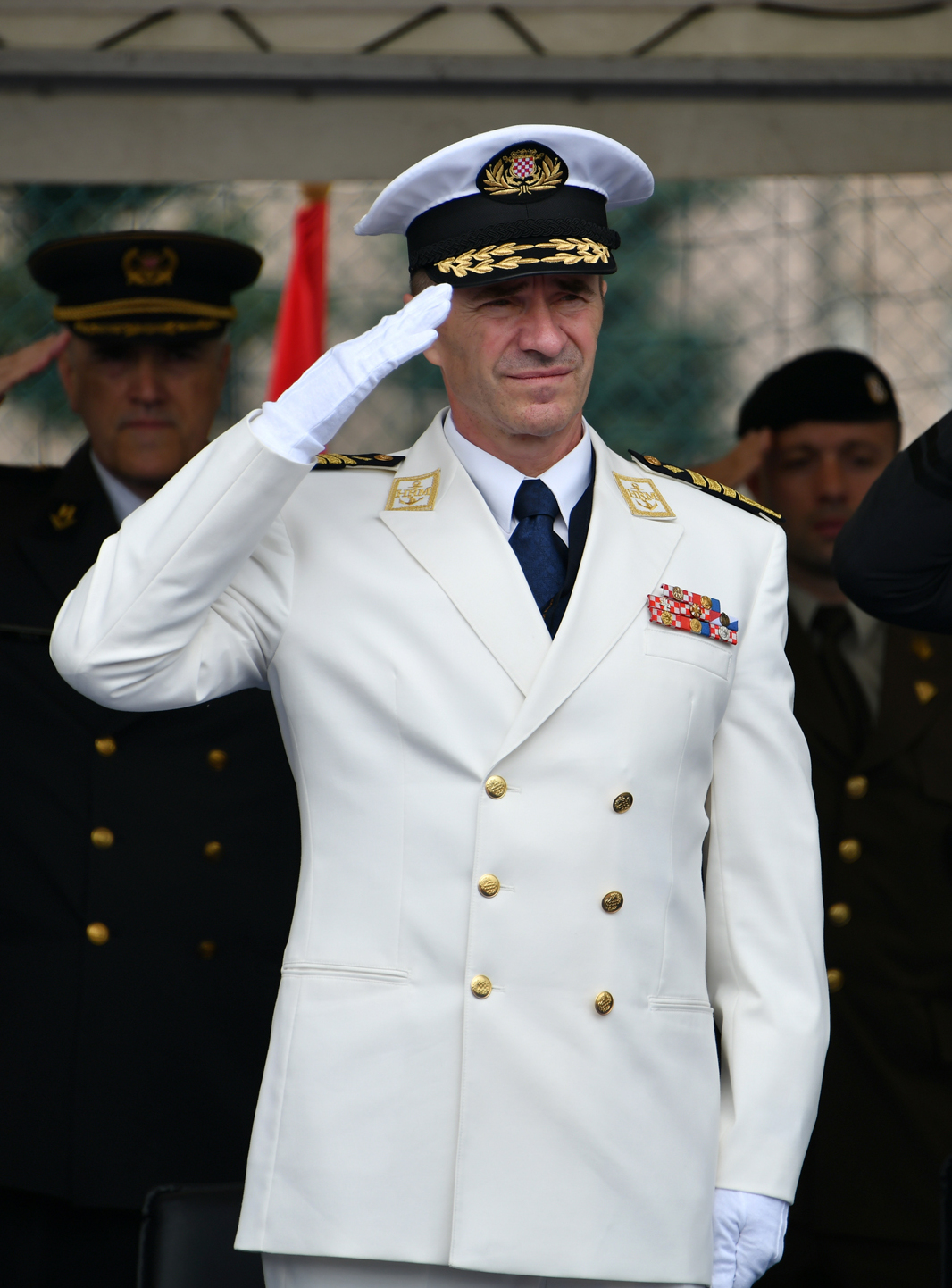
- Born: 5 September 1962 (age 63); Varaždin, PR Croatia, FPR Yugoslavia (modern Croatia)

Robert Hranj (born 5 September 1962 in Varaždin) is a Croatian Admiral, who served as Chief of the General Staff of the Armed Forces of Croatia. He was appointed to that position on 1 March 2020 after Zoran Milanović became the new President of Croatia. He was replaced in that position by Colonel general Tihomir Kundid on 8 March 2024.

Military offices
Preceded by Mirko Šundov	Chief of the General Staff of Armed Forces of Croatia; 1 March 2020 – 8 March 2024	Succeeded by Tihomir Kundid
