= Zvonimir Červenko =

Croatian general

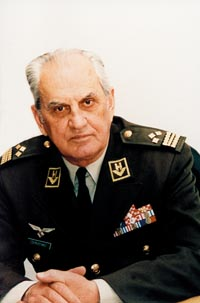
- Born: 13 November 1926; Prijepolje, Kingdom of Serbs, Croats and Slovenes (modern Serbia)
- Died: 17 February 2001 (aged 74); Zagreb, Croatia
- Burial place: Alley of Croatian Heroes, Mirogoj Cemetery, Zagreb
- Military career
- Allegiance: Yugoslavia; Croatia
- Branch: Yugoslav Air Force; Croatian Army
- Rank: Lieutenant Colonel (JNA), Staff General (stožerni general), (Croatian Army)
- Commands: General Staff of the Armed Forces of the Republic of Croatia
- Conflicts: Croatian War of Independence: Operation Flash; Operation Storm; Operation Summer '95
- Awards: Grand Order of King Petar Krešimir IV; Order of Duke Domagoj; Order of Ban Jelačić
- Other work: Member of Parliament

Zvonimir Červenko (13 November 1926 – 17 February 2001) was a Croatian general and Chief of the General Staff of the Armed Forces of Croatia from 1995 to 1996.

== Origin ==
Červenko's grand-grandfather was a Czech with a surname Červenka.

== Croatian War of Independence ==
At the beginning of the Croatian War of Independence, Franjo Tuđman, president of the Republic of Croatia offered him the position of the minister of defence, but Červenko refused saying "I'm a soldier, not politician". He organized the defence of Zagreb, the blockade of enemy barracks, and started the process of forming 14 brigades in Zagreb. In January 1992, Červenko became the commander of Croatian Home Guard (Domobranstvo), becoming deputy of chief of the General Staff.

The top of his military career came just before the Operation Storm, when he succeeded Janko Bobetko in the position of Chief of the General Staff. He served as Chief of General Staff from 15 July 1995 until 16 November 1996. During his command, the Croatian Army executed the most successful operation of the war, Operation Storm. He later became a member of the Chamber of Counties of the Croatian Parliament (Sabor) on the electoral list of the Croatian Democratic Union. Beginning in 2000 he served as a member of the Amnesty Commission.

== Death ==
Červenko died on 17 February 2001 in Zagreb. He was buried in Alley of Croatian Heroes at the Mirogoj Cemetery.

== Decorations ==
- Grand Order of King Petar Krešimir IV,
- Order of Duke Domagoj,
- Order of Ban Jelačić,
- Order of the Croatian Trefoil,
- Order of the Croatian Interlace,
- Commemorative Medal of the Homeland War,
- Medal for Participation in Operation "Flash"
- Medal for Participation in Operation "Summer '95"
- Medal for Participation in Operation "Storm"
