= Chief of the General Staff of the Armed Forces (Croatia) =

Chief of the General Staff of the Croatian Armed Forces

Chief of the General Staff
- Načelnik Glavnog stožera Oružanih snaga Republike Hrvatske
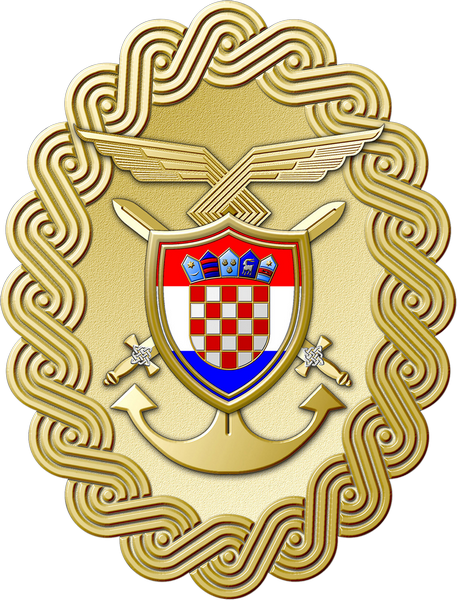
- Seal of the Chief of General Staff

- Flag of the Chief of General Staff

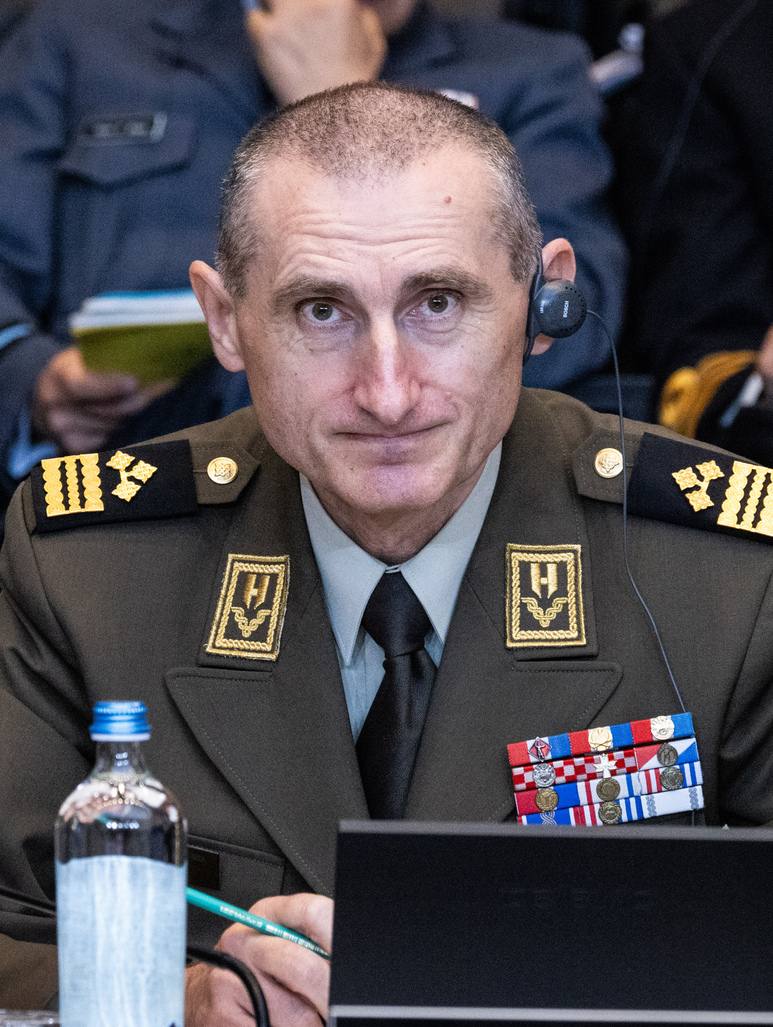
- Incumbent; Colonel general Tihomir Kundid since 8 March 2024
- Ministry of Defence
- Member of: General Staff; National Security Council
- Reports to: Minister of Defence
- Appointer: President of Croatia
- Formation: 21 September 1991; 35 years ago
- First holder: General of the Army Anton Tus

The Chief of the General Staff of the Armed Forces of the Republic of Croatia (Croatian: Načelnik Glavnog stožera Oružanih snaga Republike Hrvatske) is the principal head of the General Staff of the Armed Forces of Croatia, which is a joint body of the Armed Forces established within Ministry of Defence responsible for preparation, command and use of the Armed Forces. The Chief of the General Staff is appointed by the commander-in-chief, President of Croatia, to whom Chief of the General Staff is the principal military advisor. Chief of the General Staff is appointed for a period of four years and cannot be reappointed.

As head of the General Staff, Chief of the General Staff has authority to fully command the Armed Forces on the basis of orders of the President of Croatia, decisions of the Minister of Defence and on the basis of provisions that law entitles him. Chief of the General staff is responsible to the President and to the Minister of Defence for the implementation of orders and shall simultaneously inform them of the acts that refer to the use of the Armed Forces.

One of the independent actions that Chief of the General Staff may undertake is to order a temporary standby of the part of the Armed Forces of Croatia in the event of the danger of disasters, major accidents and accidents, of which he shall immediately inform President of the Republic, as well as Minister of Defence.

The incumbent Chief of the General Staff is Colonel general Tihomir Kundid, since 8 March 2024.

== List of chiefs of the general staff ==
No.	Portrait	Chief of the General Staff	Took office	Left office	Time in office	Defence branch	Commander-in-Chief	Ref.
1	Anton Tus	General of the Army; Anton Tus (1931–2023) (Note: Previously served as the last commander of the Yugoslav Air Force from 1985 to 1991.)	21 September 1991	20 November 1992	1 year, 60 days	Croatian Air Force	Franjo Tuđman	–
2	Janko Bobetko	General of the Army; Janko Bobetko (1919–2003) (Note: Served during the Operation Flash (1–3 May 1995).)	20 November 1992	15 July 1995	2 years, 237 days	Croatian Army	Franjo Tuđman	–
3	Zvonimir Červenko	General of the Army; Zvonimir Červenko (1926–2001) (Note: Served during the Operation Storm (4–7 August 1995).)	15 July 1995	11 November 1996	1 year, 119 days	Croatian Army	Franjo Tuđman	–
4	Pavao Miljavac	General; Pavao Miljavac (1953–2022) (Note: Afterwards served as the Minister of Defence from 1998 to 2000.)	11 November 1996	14 October 1998	1 year, 337 days	Croatian Army	Franjo Tuđman	–
5	Davor Domazet-Lošo	Admiral; Davor Domazet-Lošo (born 1948)	14 October 1998	10 March 2000	1 year, 148 days	Croatian Navy	Franjo Tuđman; Stjepan Mesić	–
6	Petar Stipetić	General of the Army; Petar Stipetić (1937–2018)	10 March 2000	30 December 2002	2 years, 295 days	Croatian Army	Stjepan Mesić	–
7	Josip Lucić	General; Josip Lucić (born 1957)	30 December 2002	16 January 2008	5 years, 17 days	Croatian Army	Stjepan Mesić	–
–	Slavko Barić [hr]	Lieutenant general Slavko Barić (born 1957); Acting	16 January 2008	28 February 2008	43 days	Croatian Army	Stjepan Mesić	–
(7)	Josip Lucić	General; Josip Lucić (born 1957)	28 February 2008	1 March 2011	3 years, 1 day	Croatian Army	Stjepan Mesić; Ivo Josipović	–
8	Drago Lovrić	General; Drago Lovrić (born 1961)	1 March 2011	1 March 2016	5 years	Croatian Army	Ivo Josipović; Kolinda Grabar-Kitarović	
9	Mirko Šundov	General; Mirko Šundov (born 1962)	1 March 2016	1 March 2020	4 years	Croatian Army	Kolinda Grabar-Kitarović; Zoran Milanović	
10	Robert Hranj	Admiral; Robert Hranj (born 1962)	1 March 2020	8 March 2024	4 years, 7 days	Croatian Navy	Zoran Milanović	
11	Tihomir Kundid	Colonel general Tihomir Kundid (born 1969)	8 March 2024	Incumbent	2 years, 210 days	Croatian Army	Zoran Milanović	
