= Honor Guard Battalion (Croatia) =

Honor Guard Battalion (Počasno-zaštitna bojna)
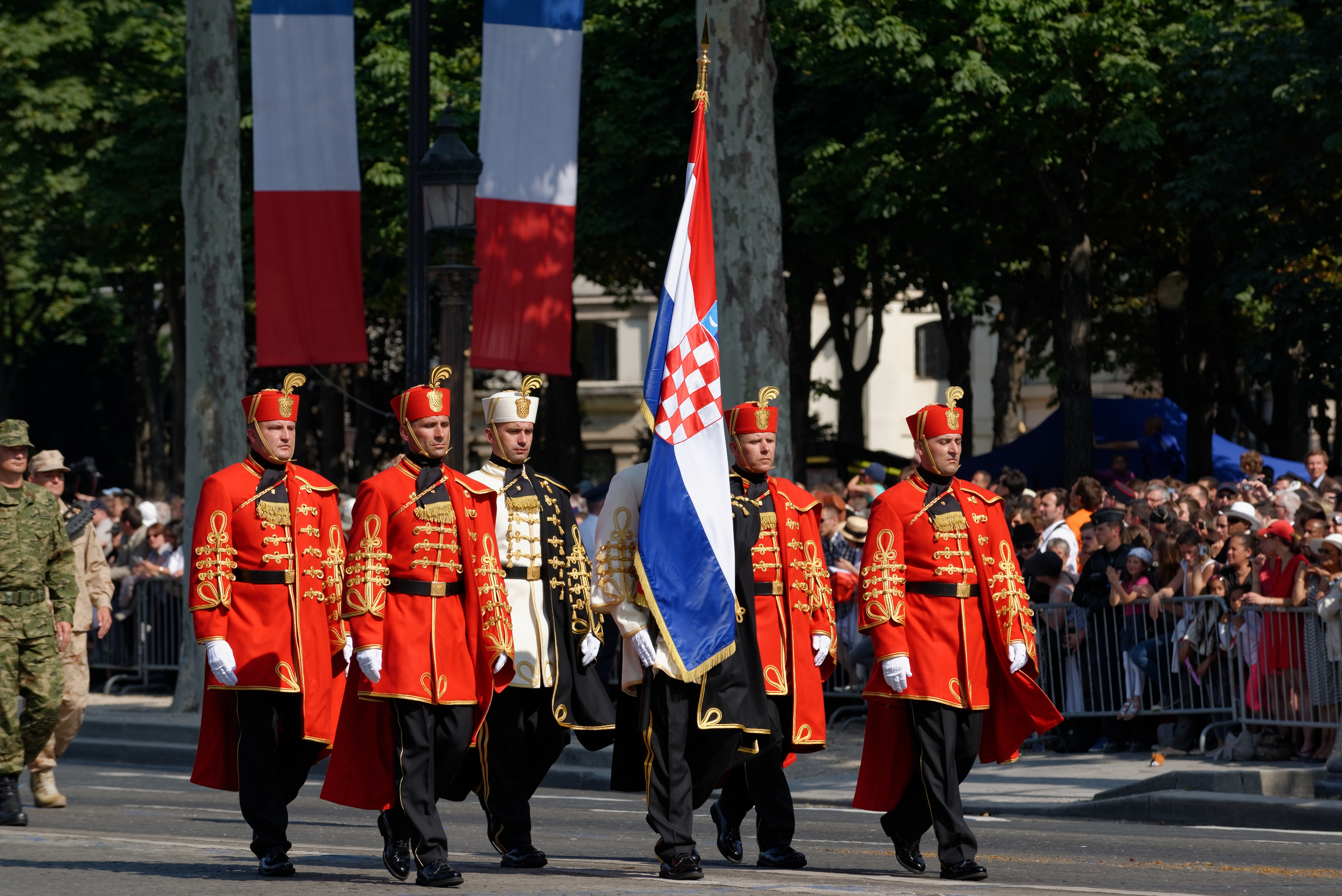
- Active: 2000–present
- Country: Croatia
- Type: Honour Guard
- Size: ~300
- Garrison/HQ: Zagreb
- Patron: St. Valentine
- Anniversaries: 25 February

Commanders
- Current commander: Brigadier Tihomir Zebec
- Notable commanders: brigadier Dragan Basić brigadier Slobodan Kratohvil brigadier Elvis Burčul

Insignia
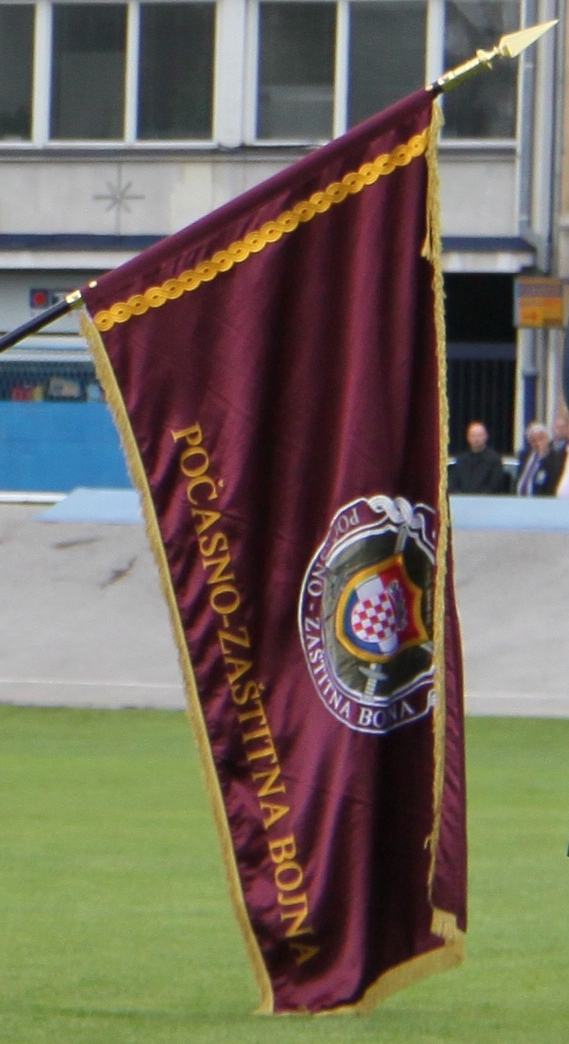
- Flag

Honor Guard Battalion (Croatian: Počasno-zaštitna bojna) is a military unit of the Armed Forces of the Republic of Croatia that performs protocol tasks for the needs of top-level state and military officials, as well as tasks related to the protection and security of the Commander-in-Chief (President of the Republic of Croatia). It consists of up to 300 members, all being professionals. The unit is under direct command of the General Staff of the Armed Forces.

== Structure ==
- Commander's Group
- Honorary Company
- Protective Company
- Security Company
- Logistics Company
- Naval Honorary Protective Company

== Weapons ==
- Semi-automatic rifle PAP M59/66
- Assault rifle VHS-2
- HS2000 pistol
- HS-9 pistol

== Ceremony of the Changing of the Guards ==
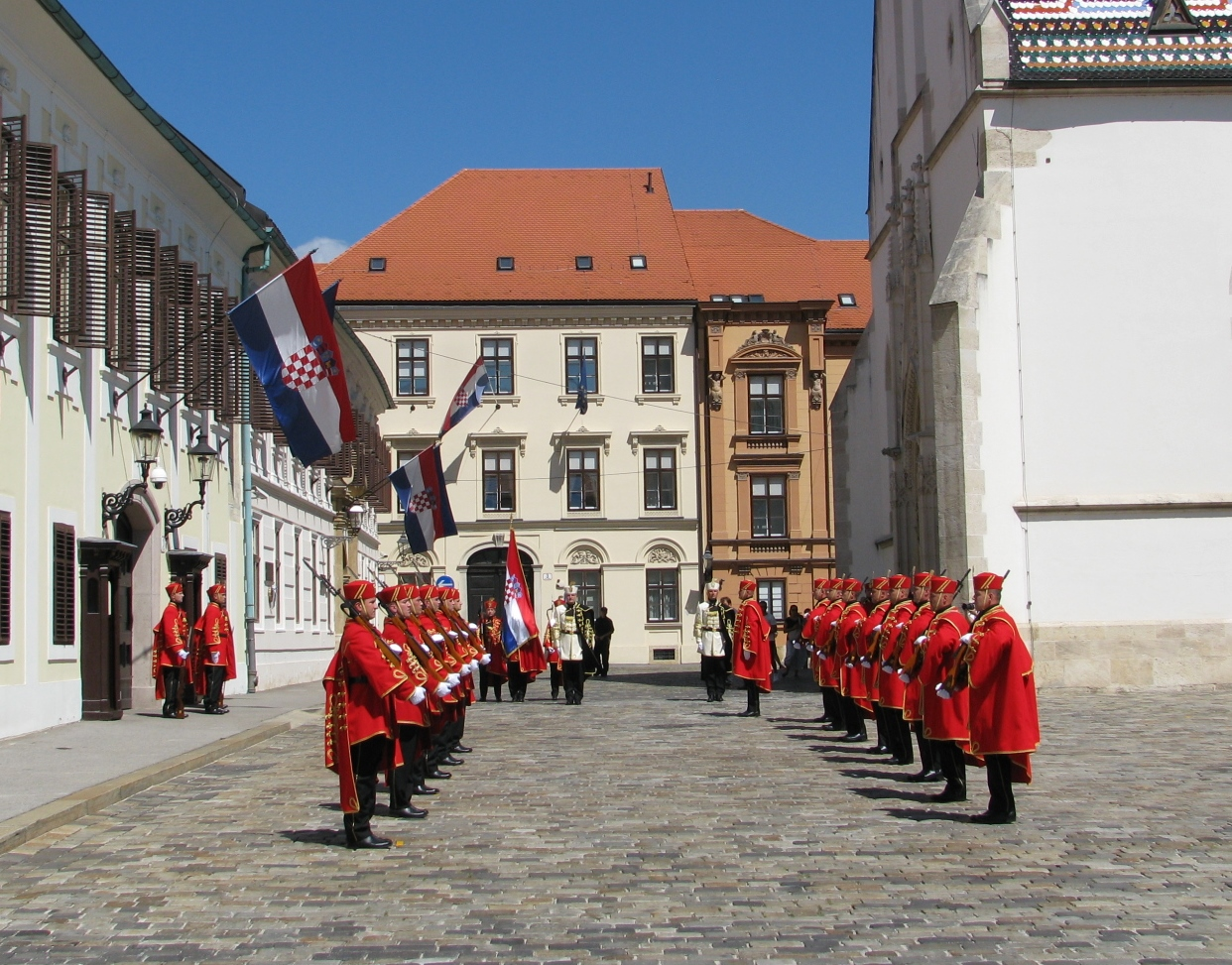
Changing of the Guards at St. Mark's Square in Zagreb

The Ceremony of the Changing of the Guards is performed by the members of the Honor Company, a unit of the Honor Guard Battalion, and it takes place in Zagreb, in the area between the Banski dvori and the Saint Mark's Church, on Saturdays and state holidays at 12:00 (CET) in the period between 27 May, and 1 October.

It is performed by three officers (wearing the historic black and white uniforms) and 26 enlisted soldiers and NCOs wearing the red ones. The officers, the Commander of the Guard and the shift commanders wear officers' dagger in the leather case, and junior members are armed with semi-automatic rifles (the M59/66 model).

The Honorary Guard is dressed in ceremonial historical uniforms designed as an original model drawing on the formal dress of the Croatian magnates and virilists of the Croatian Parliament from the historical period of Croatia proper (Banska Hrvatska) and the costumes of the Croatian National Revival period (19th century). The new uniform model thus incorporated the centuries-long military tradition and aspirations of the Croatian people for its own state. The Guards uniforms are made of quality English cloth. The red denotes the traditional Croatian colour distinguishing the Croatian uniforms from the enemy in the battlefields during the resistance to the Ottoman invaders. Until early 20th century it was also the colour of Zagreb. The uniforms in black and white are worn by officers. The design and the vivid colours are complemented with a cap with a golden Croatian coat of arms, tight-fitting braided jacket and the overcoat, white gloves and officer's dagger (worn by the commander) and the leather ammunition case.

== Gallery ==
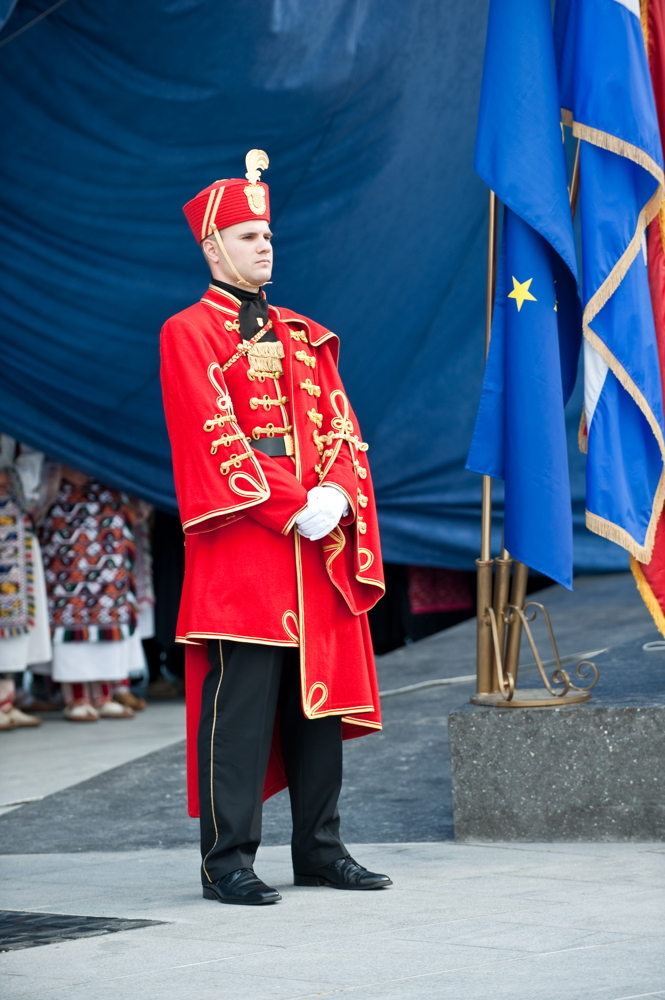
Ceremonial dress

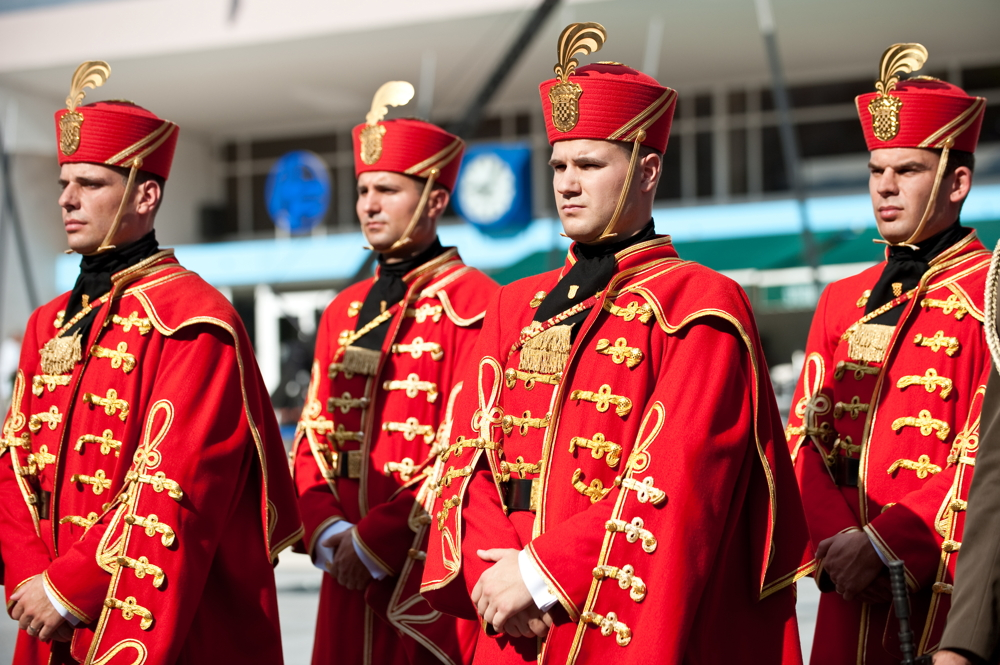
Ceremonial dress

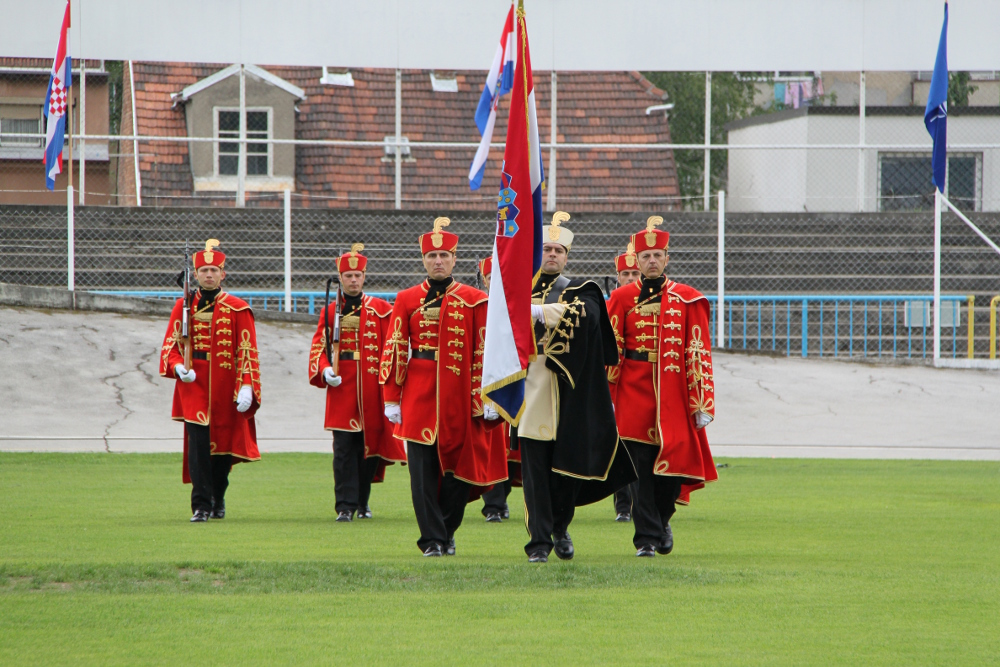
Ceremonial dress

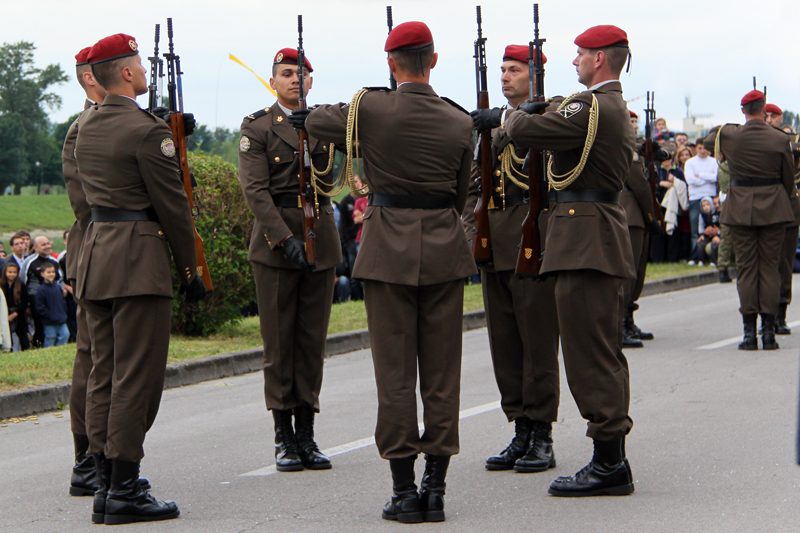
Service dress

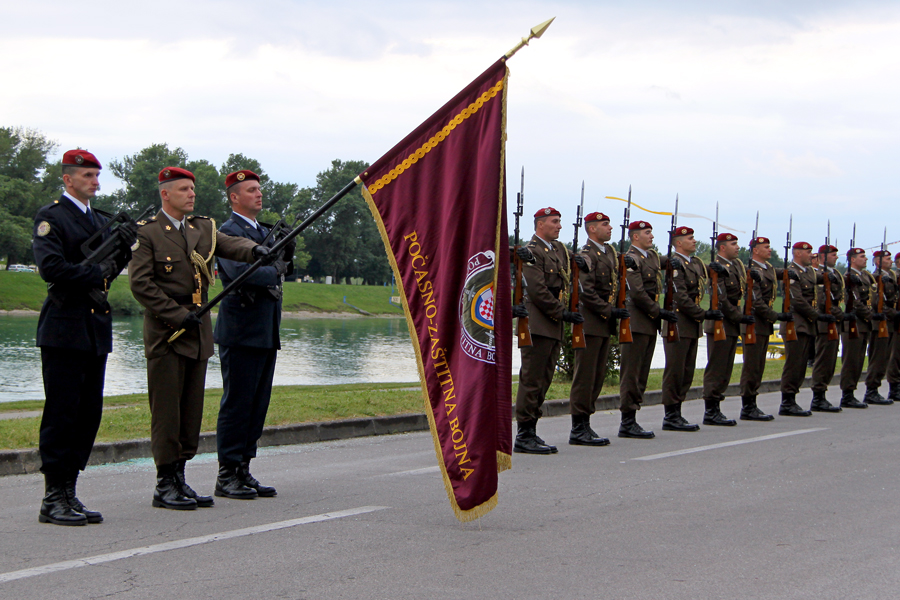
Honor guard

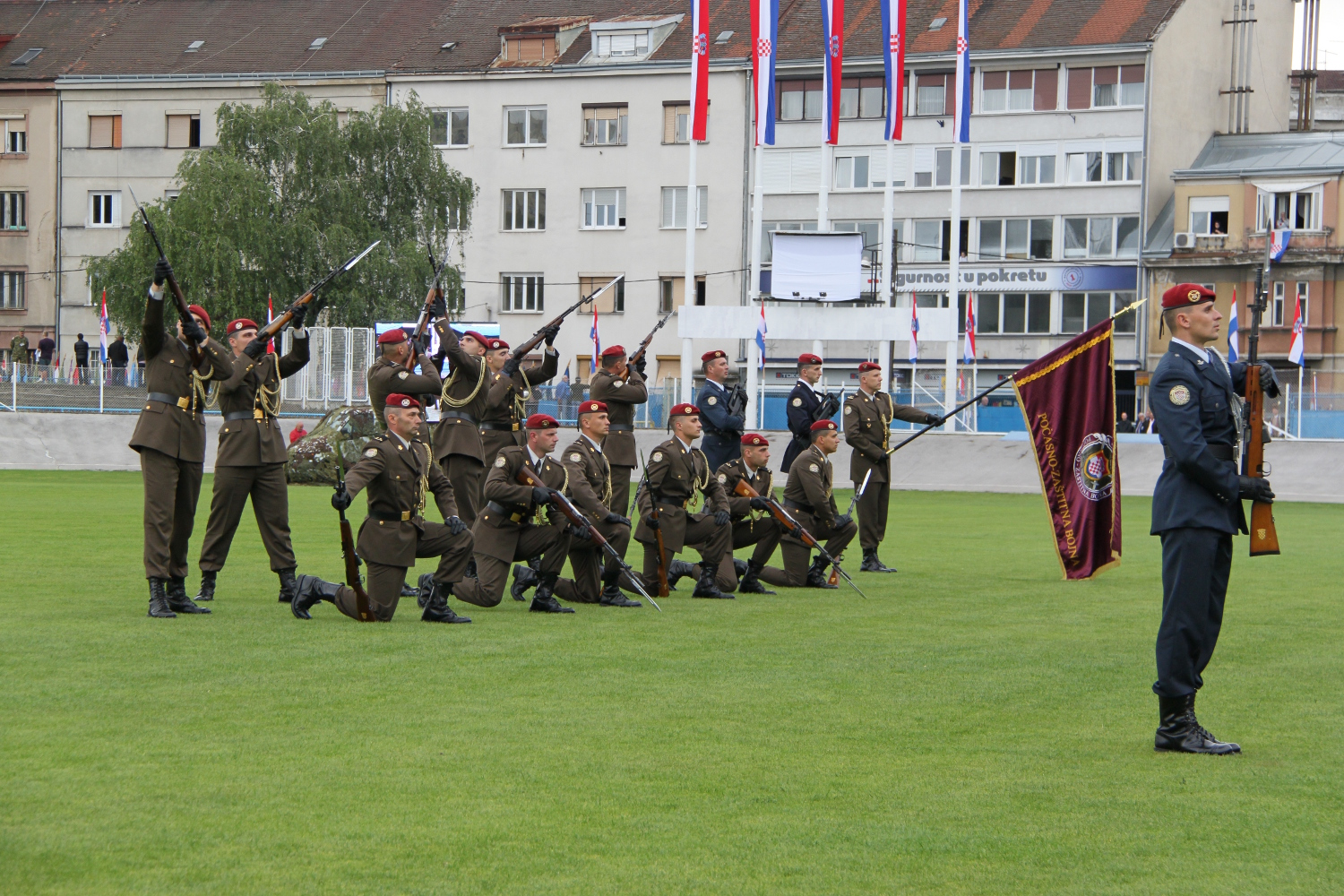
Ceremonial program

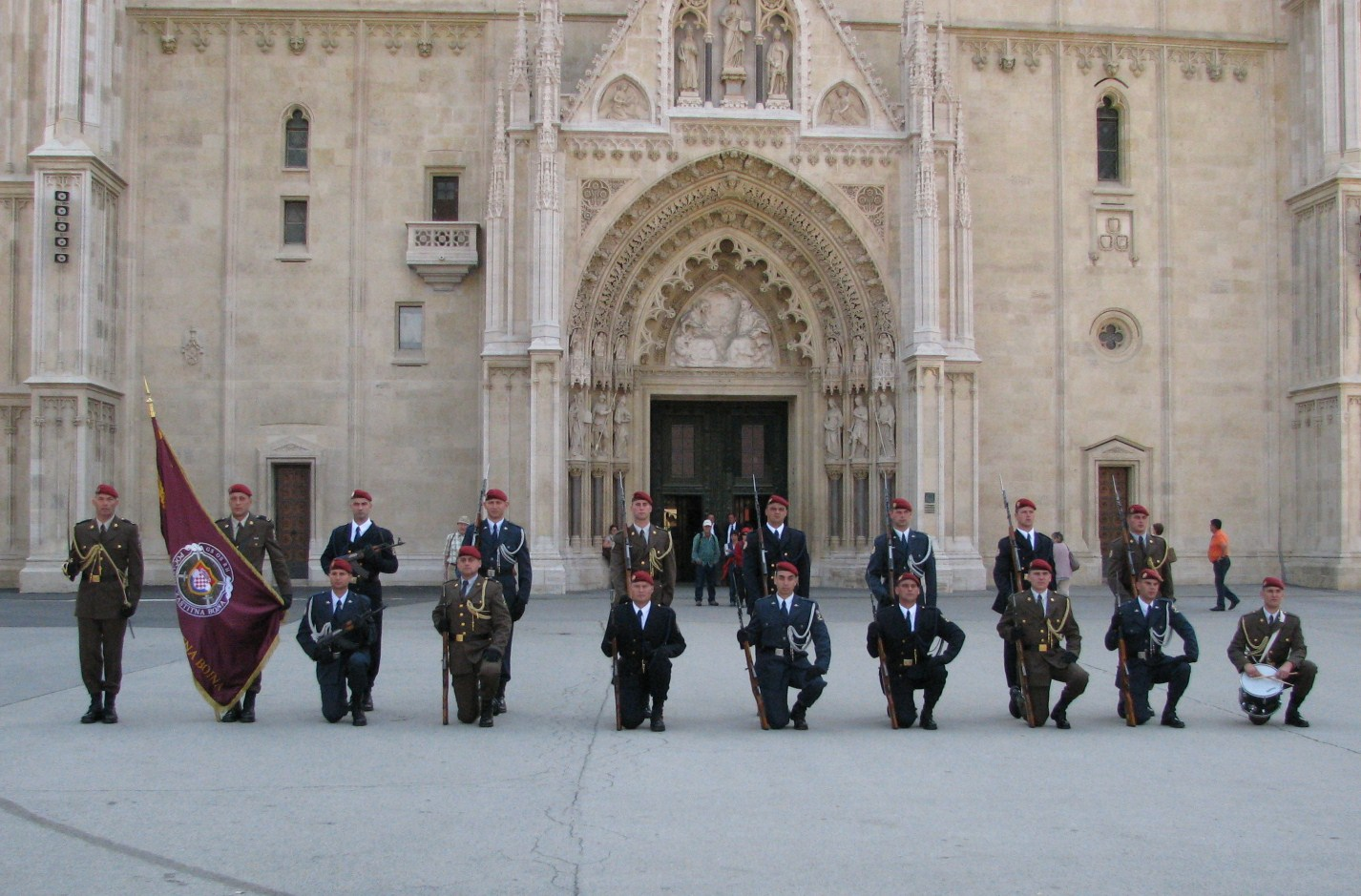
In front of Zagreb Cathedral

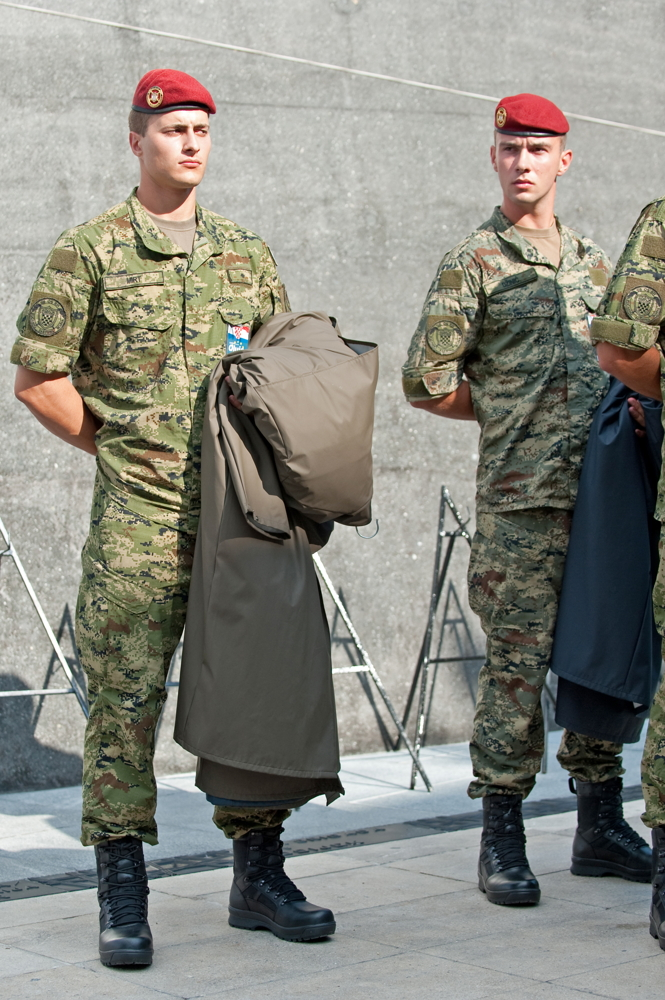
Battle dress

== See also ==
- 1st Croatian Guards Corps - predecessor unit to the Honor Guard Battalion
