= Conscription in Croatia =

Mandatory military service in Croatia

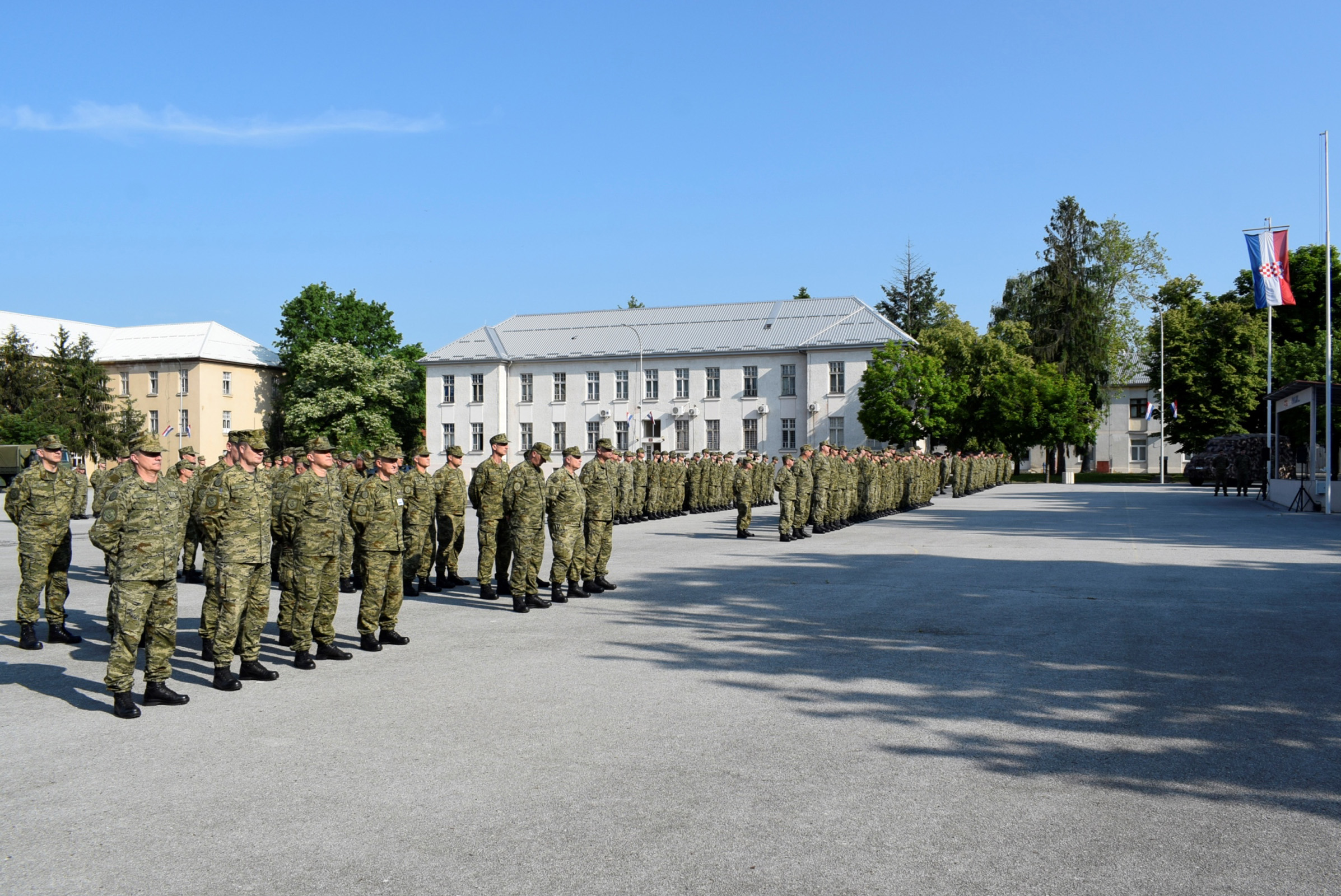
The “123rd Brigade of the Croatian Army” barracks in Požega are one of the locations where conscripts complete their training

Croatia has had conscription for men since 2025, which is carried out in the Armed Forces of Croatia. The right to conscientious objection is guaranteed by the Constitution, and those who exercise it can instead perform civilian service with the Ministry of the Interior or a local government unit.

Conscription in what is now Croatia was first partially introduced under the Austrian Empire, while universal conscription was introduced during the Austro-Hungarian period. During the Kingdom of Yugoslavia, there was considerable opposition to military service. Under the Independent State of Croatia, Serbs were generally not allowed to serve in the Home Guard. Military service remained compulsory throughout socialist Yugoslavia and lasted two years before being shortened in the 1980s. After Croatia declared independence from Yugoslavia, compulsory military service lasted 10 months, while civilian service lasted 15 months. In 2001, these periods were reduced to six months for military service and eight months for civilian service. The number of conscientious objectors subsequently increased, eventually surpassing the number of military conscripts and compulsory military service was abolished in 2007. It was reintroduced in 2025 under a new system, with the first generation of conscripts beginning their training in 2026.

== History ==
=== Habsburg Monarchy ===
While Croatia was under the administration of the Austrian Empire, the first conscription for the army was carried out in Croatia and Slavonia in 1850. Each crown land was required to provide a set number of conscripts per year, and conscription was determined by drawing lots among the registered young men. In 1852, mandatory conscription was also introduced in Dalmatia, based on a system of registering young men for service in the army and navy for a term of 8 years.

After the Austro-Hungarian Compromise of 1867, universal conscription was introduced in Austria-Hungary in 1868. All men had to complete three years of active service in the army and seven years in the reserve with some exemptions like property owners, the nobility and clergy, burghers, hand workers, merchants and farmers.

As a result of the Croatian–Hungarian Settlement in 1868, the Royal Croatian Home Guard was established. In the Home Guard, military service lasted 12 years: two in active duty and ten in the reserve.

=== Kingdom of Yugoslavia ===
After World War I, Croatia became a part of the Kingdom of Serbs, Croats and Slovenes. By decision of regent Alexander I of Yugoslavia of August 19, 1919, the Serbian Military Code began to be applied in Croatia and Slovenia, but its implementation lagged due to the drastic differences between the new law and the previous Austro-Hungarian one.

The Kingdom's mobilization system thus stipulated that all men between the ages of 18 and 52 were required to complete military service. One of the major changes was that conscripts now had to arrange their own travel to their units, a task previously organized by the authorities, and further problems were caused by calling up conscripts during the period of field work. In the first year, poor turnout among recruits was recorded in Croatia, along with desertions from barracks. The rate of draft evasion rose in the early years, and the authorities sought to curb desertions by threatening violence against conscripts or their families, as well as through levies aimed at forcing other residents of a settlement to hand over deserters. Revolts and protests occasionally broke out against the violent conduct of the gendarmery and against call-ups for military service during periods of intensive field work, such as the 1920 Croatian Peasant Rebellion.

=== Independent State of Croatia ===
Recruits of the Croatian Home Guard swear an oath of allegiance to Ante Pavelić

During the existence of the Independent State of Croatia, young men of Croatian nationality, as well as Muslims, were conscripted into the Croatian Home Guard for military service lasting two years. Members of the Orthodox faith were generally considered Serbs and were initially not permitted access to the Home Guard. An exception was made for "Croats of the Orthodox faith", who nevertheless had to be approved by a military commander to be admitted into service. Those who had converted from Orthodoxy to another recognized faith could also obtain permission to join the Home Guard. In order to ease the rebellion against the newly founded state, in 1942 Serbs began to be generally regarded as "Croats of the Orthodox faith", while Orthodox people and converts began to be regularly recruited into non-combat Home Guard labor units. Only from 1943 onward did Orthodox people gain a limited possibility of being recruited into combat units if they could prove loyalty to the state, while others continued to be placed in labor units.

=== Socialist Yugoslavia ===
Mandatory military service was established shortly after the formation of the Yugoslav People's Army at the end of World War II. Service was mandatory upon reaching the age of 18 (usually after finishing secondary school), and the place of service was most often assigned in a different region, republic, or province. Military service was a natural continuation of service in the Tito's Pioneers, which emphasized the duty of serving one's country, and in which children had the opportunity to meet war veterans and military officials. Youth work actions, although voluntary, were also considered a form of preparation of young people for the army. During the first part of their service (3-6 months), recruits underwent training, after which they were transferred to another barracks to apply the knowledge they had acquired.

Military service initially lasted two years but in 1985 it was shortened to one year as part of the army's modernization plan. Shortly afterward it was shortened again to nine months. Call-ups for service were carried out four times a year. Deferral of service was possible for those pursuing higher education considered useful for the needs of the military, but no later than the age of 27. Conscientious objection was not accepted until the late 1980s, when, at the insistence of the Slovenian authorities, a form of conscientious objection based on religious beliefs was introduced.

=== Republic of Croatia ===
Under the Constitution of Croatia adopted in 1990, Article 47 guaranteed the right to conscientious objection on religious and moral grounds. After Croatia declared independence in 1991, a new Defense Act was adopted, establishing mandatory military service lasting 10 months, as well as civilian service lasting 15 months. In 2001, mandatory military service was reduced to 6 months, and civilian service to 8 months.

Requests for civilian service gradually increased over the years, so that by 2006 the number of conscripts performing civilian service had surpassed the number of those performing military service. On October 5, 2007, the Croatian Parliament decided that, starting in 2008, conscripts would no longer be called up for mandatory military service, effectively suspending compulsory military service. The main reasons given for the suspension were that it was not cost-effective, and that with Croatia's accession to NATO, there was no longer much need for it. The last generation of conscripts to serve before the suspension was discharged on February 17, 2008.

==== Reintroduction ====
During her campaign for the 2014–15 Croatian presidential election, Kolinda Grabar-Kitarović advocated for the reintroduction of mandatory military service but said it should be shortened to 3 months. After winning the election, she reiterated this position multiple times throughout her presidency.

On January 15, 2024, Prime Minister Andrej Plenković said that he had tasked Minister of Defence Ivan Anušić with introducing one month of mandatory military training after high school, during which everyone would receive training in first aid, weapons handling, and nuclear and chemical protection. In June, Anušić announced that the military service would last between two and three months and that recruits would receive a monthly allowance of €900.

On 4 June 2025, Anušić, together with other government officials, presented amendments to the Defence Act and the Act on Service in the Armed Forces to enable the reintroduction of compulsory military service. He announced that the monthly allowance would be €1,100 and that the two-month period of military service would count towards their work experience. In October, the final proposal for amendments to the Defence Act was presented to the Croatian Parliament. It was passed on October 24, with 84 votes in favor, 30 abstentions and 11 votes against.

In January 2026, the Ministry of Defense sent out call-up notices to 1,200 candidates for the first group of conscripts.

== Recruitment ==
Conscription is based on a pool of male Croatian citizens aged 18 to 27, although the limit can be extended until 30. All 18-year-old men are registered in the military register and sent to military training in the calendar year when they turn 19.

Students can defer military training until age 29 until they complete their higher education as well as competition athletes, members of the Croatian diaspora, sole earners in a household, and employed trainees. Delays can also be granted for major life events like marriage, childbirth, a close family member’s death, or starting a business. Skipping service without a valid reason can result in fines of €250 to €1,320.

Exemptions apply to those who are deemed unfit for service, have serious criminal records or psychiatric conditions, cadets in training under a contract with the Croatian Ministry of Defense, police academy students who request it, members of religious orders who have taken vows and those with dual citizenship who have already been conscripted in another country.

Service is not mandatory for women but they may volunteer until the end of the calendar year in which they turn 30. Men who are not called up for military service may also volunteer.

Recruits must first pass the medical exam which consists of four parts:

- Examination by a family medicine doctor
- Examination by a dental medicine doctor
- Anthropometric measurements
- Inspection of submitted medical and other documentation important for determining a candidate’s health condition

After the medical exam, recruits deemed fit for military service can begin basic training.

== Military service ==
As of August 2026, military training can be completed at four locations: Požega, Knin, Slunj and Vinkovci.

The military training lasts two months and covers some military skills like handling weapons, using modern equipment such as drones, as well as first aid and basic self-defense techniques along with theoretical lessons about warfare and the Croatian War of Independence.

Conscripts must maintain a professional appearance, which includes keeping their hair, beard, and mustache well-groomed. They stay in accommodation with 10–18 beds per room and receive full military and sports gear.

Conscripts receive financial compensation equivalent to 90% of a soldier’s pay, which is around €1,100 per month. The two-month service also counts toward their work experience and they have employment preference for future military jobs.

== Civilian service ==
Article 47 of the Croatian Constitution guarantees the right to conscientious objection.

Military service and defence of the Republic of Croatia shall be the duty of every capable citizen of the Republic of Croatia. Conscientious objection shall be allowed for all those who, based on religious or moral conviction, are not willing to perform military duties in the armed forces. Such persons are obliged to perform other duties as specified by law.

Once a conscript is registered and completes their medical and psychological exams, they can claim conscientious objection after which they are sent to alternative civilian service. They can also claim it later, even while serving. Alternative civilian service lasts three months and the training can take place in Jastrebarsko, Divulje, and Bizovac.

There are two options for conscripts who choose civilian service. The first is three months of crisis response training with the Civil Protection, helping out during fires, floods, or earthquakes and the second is four months in local government units on community tasks for five days a week, eight hours per day.

In the Civil Protection, the conscripts go through basic civil protection training, specialist training for specific emergency response roles, and a final hands-on practice phase. Their allowance is around €340 per month.

In local units, conscripts maintain public spaces, roads, and parks, manage waste, plant trees, and support fire prevention and civil protection. Their allowance is around €170 per month.

== Statistics ==
Year	Military conscripts	Civilian service conscripts	Military/Civilian service ratio
1992	12,770	152	84.01
1993	22,145	185	119.70
1994	18,605	287	64.83
1995	19,337	258	74.95
1996	25,053	211	118.73
1997	25,125	160	157.03
1998	24,294	189	128.54
1999	25,924	286	90.64
2000	25,684	680	37.77
2001	24,469	4,009	6.10
2002	21,589	8,556	2.52
2003	14,045	9,711	1.45
2004	12,892	10,302	1.25
2005	10,579	10,180	1.04
2006	7,829	9,512	0.82
2007	2,069	2,379	0.87

== See also ==
- Court-martial
- Armed Forces of Croatia
- Military history of Croatia

== Bibliography ==
- Janjatović, Bosiljka (1995). "HRVATSKI SELJACI I PITANJE VOJNE OBVEZE 1918.-1925". Historijski zbornik (in Croatian). 48: 141–153. ISSN 0351-2193.
- Barić, Nikica (December 31, 2002). "Položaj Srba u domobranstvu Nezavisne države Hrvatske, 1941. - 1945". Polemos : časopis za interdisciplinarna istraživanja rata i mira (in Croatian). V (9–10): 159–175. ISSN 1331-5595.
- Ristić, Ana Marija (2025). "Vojni rok u JNA kroz kolektivno sjećanje ročnika u razdoblju 1980. – 1989". repozitorij.ffzg.unizg.hr (in Croatian). Faculty of Humanities and Social Sciences, University of Zagreb.
- Golomboš, Matija (2022). "Vojni rok u kulturno-antropološkoj perspektivi". repozitorij.ffzg.unizg.hr (in Croatian). Faculty of Humanities and Social Sciences, University of Zagreb.
