= Janko Bobetko =

Croatian general

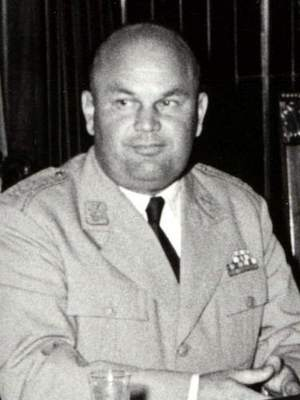
- General Janko Bobetko in 1957
- Born: 10 January 1919; Crnac (part of Sisak), Kingdom of Serbs, Croats and Slovenes
- Died: 29 April 2003 (aged 84); Zagreb, Croatia
- Military career
- Allegiance: (Socialist Federal Republic of Yugoslavia) Yugoslavia (1941–1991); Croatia (1991–2003)
- Service years: 1945–1971 (JNA); 1992–1995 (HV)
- Rank: Lieutenant General (JNA); General of the Army (HV)
- Commands: Chief of General Staff (HV); Commander of Southern Front (HV); Chief of Staff of 5th Army District (JNA); Political Commissar of 32nd Division; Political Commissar of Brigade
- Conflicts: World War II; Croatian War of Independence: Operation Tiger; Operation Maslenica; Operation Jackal; Operation Medak Pocket; Operation Flash

Janko Bobetko (10 January 1919 – 29 April 2003) was a Croatian general who had participated in World War II and later in the Croatian War of Independence. He was one of the founding members of 1st Sisak Partisan Detachment, the first anti-fascist military unit during World War II in Yugoslavia. He later had a military career in the Yugoslav People's Army (JNA).

In 1992, Bobetko became the Chief of the General Staff of the Croatian Army (HV). He served in this capacity until his retirement in 1995. Bobetko had been charged with war crimes by the International Criminal Tribunal for the former Yugoslavia but died before he could be tried; a later verdict in another case found that he took part in the joint criminal enterprise against the non-Croat population during the Bosnian War.

== Biography ==
Bobetko was born in the village of Crnac, Sisak in the Kingdom of Serbs, Croats and Slovenes. He studied at the veterinary faculty in the University of Zagreb, but Croatian pro-Nazi authorities expelled him from university at the start of World War II for his anti-fascist views.

=== World War II and Yugoslav army career ===
In July 1941, he joined an antifascist unit, the 1st Sisak Partisan Detachment in the Brezovica Forest near Sisak. Bobetko fought for the Yugoslav Partisans from 1941-45. His father and three brothers were killed by the Nazi-affiliated Ustashe. He was heavily wounded in the Battle of Sutjeska in Montenegro, but survived to become a Yugoslav People's Army (JNA) officer.

In the post-war period, he graduated from the Military Academy of the Yugoslav People's Army and rose to the rank of lieutenant-general. During the Croatian Spring period of the early 1970s, he supported greater autonomy for Croatia in Yugoslavia, and was demoted and expelled from the JNA in 1972 after Tito's crackdown on perceived separatists and nationalists in the constituent parts of the former Yugoslavia.

=== Service in independent Croatia ===
After the 1990 Croatian parliamentary elections, Bobetko refused to accept the position of defense minister. His involvement in the Croatian War of Independence began in Banovina and continued on the Southern Front, where he took command on 10 April 1992. On 20 November 1992, Bobetko was named the Chief of the General Staff of the Armed Forces of the Republic of Croatia.

In 1993, during Operation Medak pocket against Serb Krajina strongholds that controlled the town of Gospić, the Croatian soldiers were accused of committing crimes against humanity and violating the laws or customs of war, which Bobetko denied. In his 1996 memoir, All My Battles, which contained many military maps and commands, he wrote that the action—aimed at ending the Serbian bombardment of Gospić—was brilliant.

Bobetko had the status of a fully disabled person, caused both by his leg injury he sustained during World War II, and later by an onset of cardiac decompensation in 1994. Because of this he was hospitalized in 1995 during Operation Flash. The extent of his disability was at one point disputed by the Ministry of Defense, but it was later fully reinstated by a court order.

On 15 July 1995, shortly before Operation Storm, President Franjo Tuđman formally replaced Bobetko as the Chief of General Staff with Zvonimir Červenko. Later that year, he was elected in the 1995 Croatian parliamentary election on the electoral list of the Croatian Democratic Union (HDZ) and served as an MP until 1999.

In 2000, Bobetko was the most prominent signatory to the Twelve Generals' Letter. In September 2002, the International Criminal Tribunal for the Former Yugoslavia indicted Bobetko. He was the most senior Croatian officer sought at the tribunal. Bobetko refused to accept the indictment or surrender to the court, claiming the indictment questioned the legitimacy of the entire military operation, saying that "'there is no court on earth to have tried an army which defended and liberated its country, nor will there ever be." He also accused the tribunal of seeking "to erase our history, condemn our freedom and remove from our memories the proud days of the struggle for a free Croatia." The crisis stretched out as popular opinion agreed with Bobetko, and the anti-HDZ coalition government led by Social Democrat Prime Minister Ivica Račan would not assert an unambiguous position over his extradition. Račan himself criticised the indictment, and, in late September 2002, the Sabor unanimously passed a motion opposing the indictment charges, with moderate President Stjepan Mesić being the only major figure to consistently argue in favour of cooperation with the ICTY. The government adopted a strategy of delaying any further move until Bobetko's health declined to the point where, in early 2003, the tribunal had deemed him unfit to stand trial. Some veteran groups also went further by guarding the general's home, threatening violence if Račan's government attempted to have Bobetko forcibly arrested and extradited to the Hague.

By that time, Bobetko was already gravely ill, as well. In 2002, the United Kingdom halted its ratification process for the Stabilisation and Association Agreement of Croatia with the European Union due to the Croatian government's handling of the Bobetko case. A survey conducted by the Croatian Puls agency in late September 2002 claimed that 84% of Croatian citizens were opposed to extraditing him, and 71% would remain opposed even if the nation were threatened with political and economic sanctions.

Bobetko died in 2003, aged 84, before any final decision was reached regarding his extradition.

== Legacy ==
Bobetko was survived by his widow, Magdalena, and three sons.

The treaty ratification problem was subsequently rectified in 2004.

In May 2013, the ICTY, in a first-instance verdict against Jadranko Prlić, found that Bobetko, Tuđman and Gojko Šušak took part in the joint criminal enterprise (JCE) against the non-Croat population of Bosnia and Herzegovina during the Bosnian War. In July 2016 the Appeals Chamber in the case announced that the "Trial Chamber made no explicit findings concerning [Bobetko and others'] participation in the JCE and did not find [them] guilty of any crimes." In November 2017, the ICTY upheld the 2013 JCE verdict.

== Honours ==
- Grand Order of King Petar Krešimir IV (1995)
- City of Zadar Lifetime achievement Award (2020)
