= Tihomir Kundid =

Croatian General (born 1969)

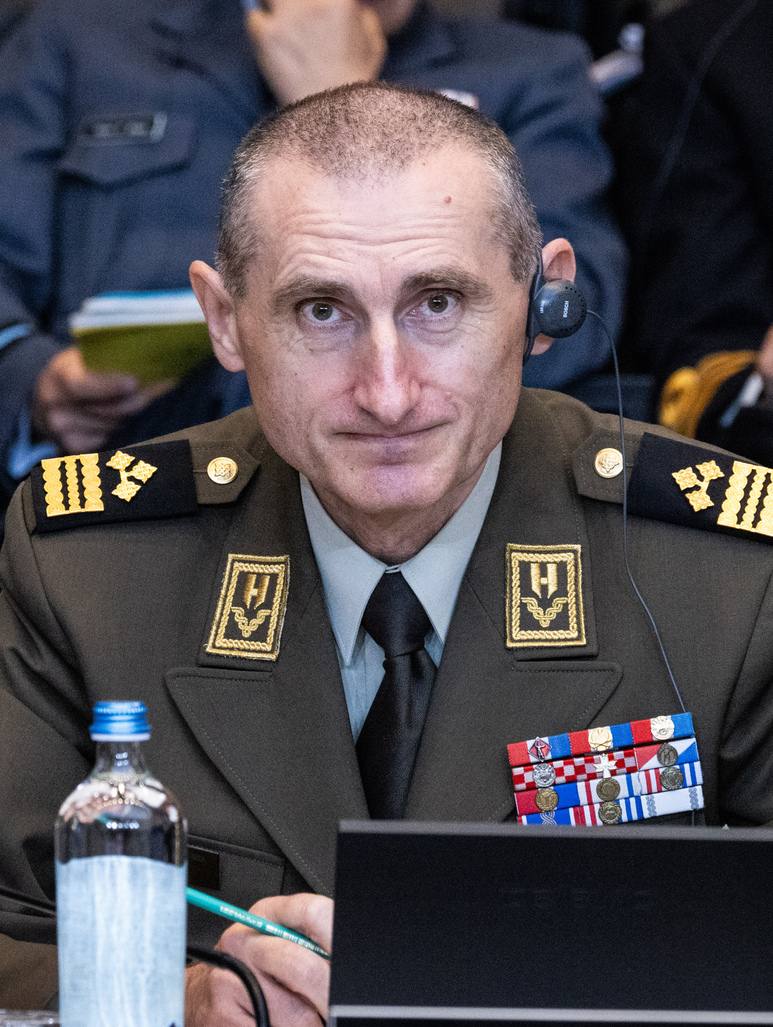
- Born: 2 February 1969 (age 57); Varaždin, SR Croatia, SFR Yugoslavia (modern Croatia)
- Allegiance: Yugoslavia; Croatia
- Branch: Croatian Army
- Rank: Colonel general
- Commands: General Staff
- Conflicts: Croatian War of Independence
- Awards: Homeland War Memorial Medal; Homeland's Gratitude Medal; Order of the Croatian Interlace; Order of the Croatian Trefoil; Order of Nikola Šubić Zrinski; Order of Ban Jelačić

Tihomir Kundid (born 2 February 1969) is a Croatian general who has served as Chief of the General Staff of the Armed Forces of Croatia since 8 March 2024.

== Biography ==
Tihomir Kundid was born in 1969 in Varaždin. He graduated from the Faculty of Mechanical Engineering and postgraduate studies at the Faculty of Organization and Informatics, University of Zagreb. He graduated from the Advanced Officer School as the best student, the Command and Staff School, the War School "Ban Josip Jelačić" and the Canadian Forces Language School.

He voluntarily joined the defence of the Republic of Croatia in December 1990, and in 1991 he became a member of the Special Police of the Ministry of the Interior of the Republic of Croatia. After that, he became part of the 2nd Guards Brigade "Thunders", where he remained until 2007. In the 2nd Guards Brigade, he performed a number of responsible and command duties including the position of commander of the armoured battalion. In March 2020, Kundid was made the deputy commander of the Croatian Army, and in October 2023 he became the commander.

During his career, he has been praised and awarded several times for the professional performance of tasks and above-average results in his work and has been awarded a number of medals for his outstanding duty.

Military offices
| Preceded by Robert Hranj | Chief of the General Staff of the Armed Forces of Croatia; 8 March 2024 – present | Incumbent |
