= Davor Domazet-Lošo =

Croatian soldier, writer and politician

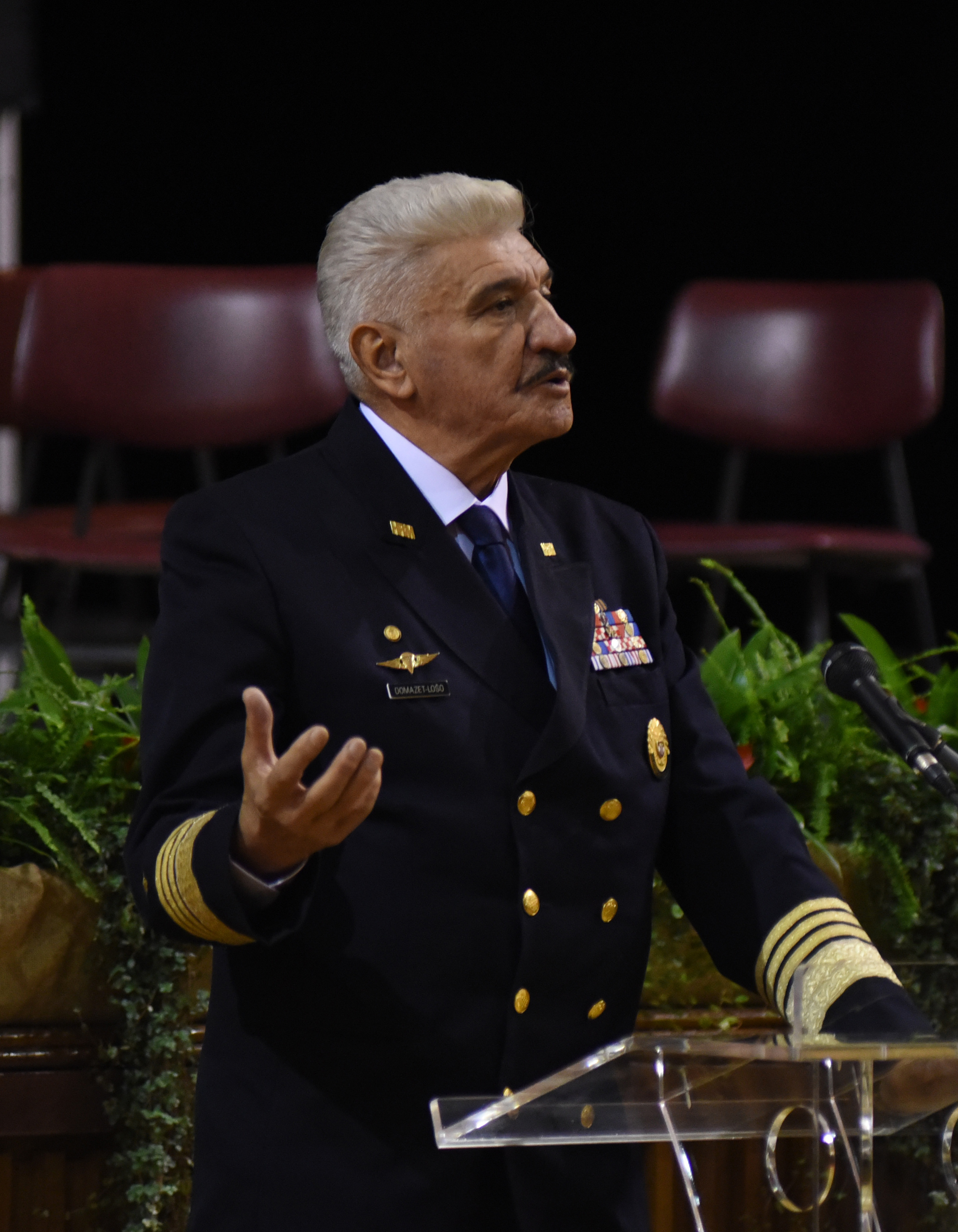
- Born: 1 May 1948 (age 78); Sinj, PR Croatia, FPR Yugoslavia (modern Croatia)
- Military career
- Allegiance: Yugoslavia (until 1991); Croatia (1991–2000)
- Rank: Admiral
- Nickname: Lošo
- Commands: General Staff (1998–2000)
- Battles: Croatian War of Independence

Davor Domazet-Lošo (born 1 May 1948) is a Croatian politician, writer, and a retired admiral of the Croatian Navy.

== Biography ==
=== Military career ===
Domazet-Lošo graduated from all the Yugoslav People's Army schools, including the Military Academy, and started his military career in the Yugoslav Navy.

Domazet-Lošo (then a captain) defected to the Croatian Army in july 1991. He became actively involved in military operations and organized the military intelligence services. He became the head of the Office for Strategic Research (1991), and the head of the Intelligence Service of the Croatian Army Headquarters (1992).

In 1992, he and Ante Gotovina were the chief commanders of the Livno front and the large area of military operations covering the northern and central Dalmatia, southern Bosnia and Herzegovina. His biggest strategic successes include the planning of major operations in Croatia and Bosnia and Herzegovina (Operation Flash, Operation Storm, Operation South Move) and the fight against enemy intelligence, as well as the incursions into the enemy camp - the most spectacular being the wiretapping of Slobodan Milošević in his Belgrade headquarters.

He continued his career in the Croatian Army, becoming a rear admiral and finally an admiral in 2000. He served as the Deputy Chief of Staff and the Chief of Staff (1998–2000).

== After retirement ==
Domazet-Lošo was forced into retirement in 2000, after he and eleven other generals signed an open letter accusing the Croatian president Stjepan Mesić of participating in the attempt to denigrate and criminalize the Croatian War of Independence and its participants.

Later he became one of the leaders of a political party, Croatian True Revival.

Ever since his days in the Yugoslav Army, Domazet-Lošo has been publishing numerous expert articles on the issues of war, navy and submarines. His more recent works deal with geopolitics and geostrategy. His most important work in that area is Hrvatska i veliko ratište (Croatia and the Large Front, 2002). He published his last two books, Gospodari kaosa (Masters of Chaos), in 2005 and Klonovi nastupaju (Clones perform), in 2007.

Domazet-Lošo was interrogated by the representatives of the International Criminal Tribunal for the Former Yugoslavia in 2002.

In December 2010, Amnesty International stated that, based on the May 2008 trial judgment of Rahim Ademi and Mirko Norac regarding war crimes committed by Croatian soldiers in the Operation Medak Pocket, Domazet-Lošo and his superior Janko Bobetko had command responsibility and should be prosecuted. In January 2011 the Ministry of Justice reported that "inquests are being made" in the case of Domazet-Lošo, but noted that the ICTY transferred files related to him saying they had a "lack of evidence" to bring forth a case. Domazet-Lošo then held a press conference in which he rejected these accusations calling them pressure on Croatia in its process of accession to the European Union.

Domazet-Lošo has publicly expressed support for a number of conspiracy theories. He is a proponent of the Great Replacement theory, and believes November 2015 Paris attacks were faked in order to spread fear among the population. He has stated that COVID-19 virus was artificially created, and that the purpose of the COVID-19 vaccine is to implant an "ID chip" into its recipient.
