= Armed Forces of Croatia =

Combined military forces of Croatia

- Oružane snage Republike Hrvatske (Croatian)
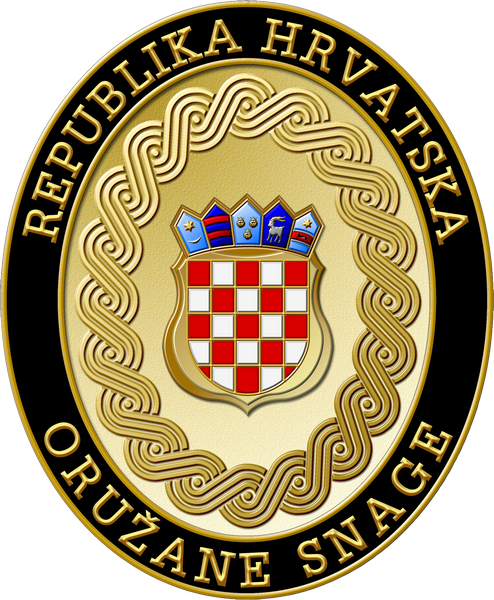
- Emblem of the Croatian Armed Forces
- Founded: 20 April 1991; 35 years ago
- Service branches: Croatian Army; Croatian Navy; Croatian Air Force
- Website: www.morh.hr/en/

Leadership
- Commander-in-Chief: Zoran Milanović
- Ministry of Defence: Ivan Anušić
- Chief of the General Staff: Tihomir Kundid

Personnel
- Military age: 18 – 30
- Conscription: Yes
- Active personnel: 13,814 (2024)
- Reserve personnel: 17,352 (2024)
- Deployed personnel: Kosovo – 496; Hungary – 198; Poland – 58; Iraq – 20; India / Pakistan – 13; Western Sahara – 10; Bulgaria – 4 Lithuania – 2 Lebanon – 2

Expenditure
- Budget: €1.931 billion (2025)
- Percent of GDP: 2.08% (2026)

Industry
- Domestic suppliers: Đuro Đaković (vehicles); Brodosplit (naval vessels); HS Produkt (small arms); Rheinmetall Unmanned Vehicles (robotics); Šestan-Busch (gear); Orqa (drones)
- Foreign suppliers: European Union NATO United States France Germany

Related articles
- History: Croatian military history
- Ranks: Croatian military ranks

The Armed Forces of the Republic of Croatia (Croatian: Oružane snage Republike Hrvatske – OSRH) are the national military forces of Croatia. The Croatian military consists of three service branches: the Croatian Army, the Croatian Navy and the Croatian Air Force. The OSRH is headed by the President of Croatia as commander-in-chief while defence policy is overseen by the Government of Croatia. The military supports the foreign policy of Croatia and Croatian security and intelligence system. The Croatian Special Forces are a co-equal tactical command unit.

Since the Croatian War of Independence (1991–1995), the Armed Forces have played a key role in protecting territorial integrity. The military's first foreign deployment was in 2003 – the War in Afghanistan and Iraq War – later joining the military alliance NATO in 2009. Croatia maintains a close security and foreign intelligence relationship with NATO and the United States. The military has deployed to various United Nations (UN), NATO, and American-led missions around the world. Since joining the European Union (EU) in 2013, it became a part of the EU defence forces.

The Armed Forces have seen significant militarization and modernization since the early 2020s due to regional geopolitical risk. Its deep integration within Europe and the U.S. has led to a robust defence industrial base and emerging defence sector. The Croatian military is among the most technologically-advanced in Southeast Europe. Croatia has had military conscription since 2025, previously enacted from 1991 to 2008. The Armed Forces are spread across continental Croatia and capital city Zagreb, with the Navy largely based in Split.

== History ==
=== Formation in the early 1990s ===
In the late spring of 1991, the first military units of the National Guard Corps were formed, established on 20 April 1991. The Croatian Party of Rights organized its armed detachments, the Croatian Defence Forces (HOS), which were privately armed, relatively trained and trained at the tactical level, and deployed to critical positions on the battlefields. The Party of Democratic Change (ZNG) armed its activists in Istria, the Littoral and Dalmatia, as did the ruling Croatian Democratic Union (HDZ) in other parts of Croatia. In some places, the teritorijalna obrana (TO) ("Territorial Defense") system was reactivated in Zagreb which proved more effective.

These interrelated armed forces were organized into a single Croatian Army (HV) on the basis of the new defence Law, and when the General Staff was established on 21 September 1991, with Chief General Anton Tus as its Chief. At that time, a more systematic mobilization of reserve soldiers and the organization of units, commands and institutions began, as well as the planned use of forces. On 1 October 1991, large military-territorial and combat commands (Operational Zones) were formed with headquarters in Osijek, Bjelovar, Zagreb, Karlovac, Rijeka and Split.

=== Croatian War of Independence ===
During the Homeland War, the armed forces gradually grew to about 300,000 service-members. Most of the units were filled from the reserve, i.e. from the personnel who acquired basic military knowledge during their compulsory military service in the Yugoslav People's Army. As the war progressed, through clandestine operations, significant amounts of military surpluses created after the collapse of the Warsaw Pact were purchased; in particular, the procurement of combat aircraft of Soviet origin was significant for the formation of the Croatian Air Force. The Air Force had included about twenty MiG 21 aircraft and several Mil Mi-24 combat helicopters. The domestic industry of Croatia was capable of significant independent production of weapons and military equipment. The Croatian Navy was created to a large extent with the successful capture of about a quarter of the Yugoslav Navy vessels in Šibenik in 1991. Swedish RBS-15 anti-ship missiles were captured.

=== 21st century ===
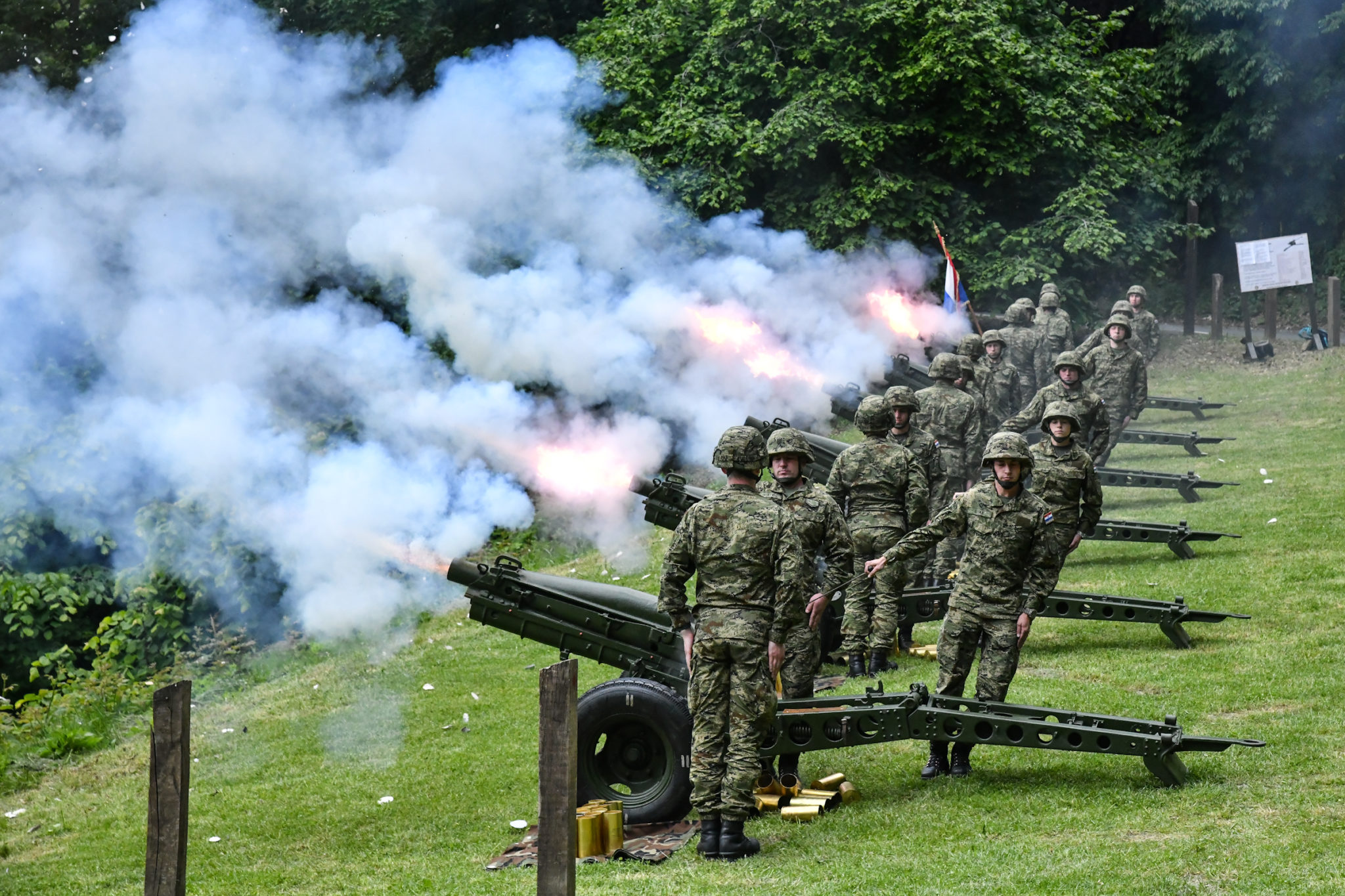
A Croatian Army M116 howitzer demonstration, 2020

Following the independence of Croatia in 1990s, the Croatian Armed Forces underwent a series of reforms and modernization programs during the 2000s. The first foreign deployment of Croatian soldiers was to the NATO-led International Security Assistance Force Mission (ISAF) in 2003 within Afghanistan. Later that year, they deployed to Iraq – following the American-led invasion of Iraq – for a large-scale stabilization operation. In 2006, the Croatian military led a successful capture of a small group of Taliban rebels in the Afghani city of Kandahar. In 2007, the Croatian government professionalized their Armed Forces by waiving the year's requirement for compulsory military service. The first generation of volunteer conscripts began serving in November 2008, after formal military conscription concluded following its 1991 initiation. In preparation for their eventual ascension into military alliance NATO in 2009, the military emphasized mobility and interoperability. The military heavily redeployed into ISAF during the 2010s, rejoining American-led coalition forces for Resolute Support Mission. Starting in 2017, Croatia joined the U.S. Armed Forces in Iraq and Kuwait for Operation Inherent Resolve for nearly a decade to deter the Islamic State of Iraq and the Levant (ISIL). A Croatian soldier was killed with two others injured after a retaliatory Taliban suicide attack near Kabul in 2019.

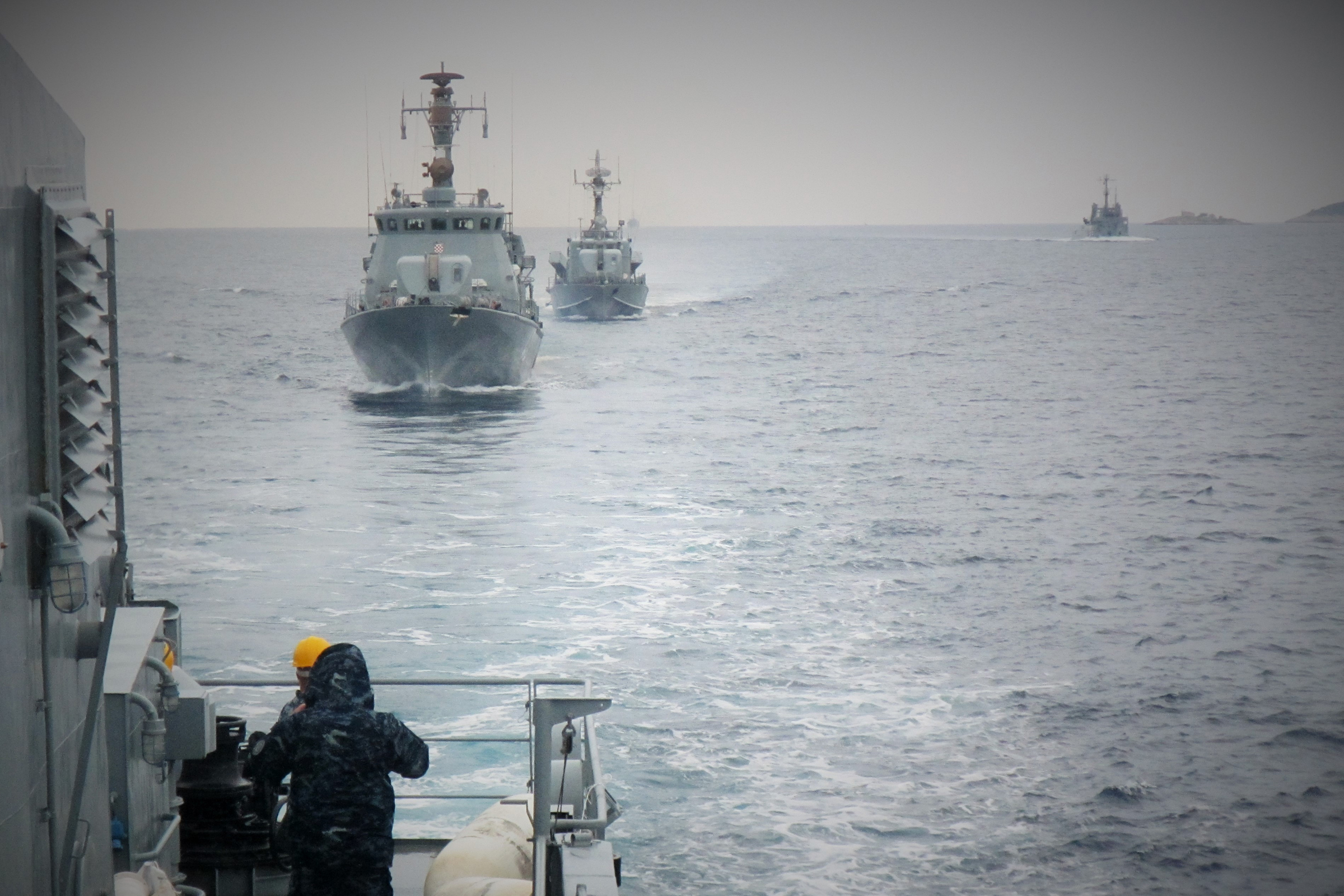
Croatian Navy ships patrolling territorial waters in 2021, on the Adriatic Sea

Modern 21st century military objectives have focused on developing advanced collective defence and security mechanisms, namely:

- transition to the professionalization of the Croatian Armed Forces, which means replenishment of soldiers voluntarily, and not through conscription;
- the transition to a collective defence system means a smaller active and reserve composition, but better trained, equipped, compatible and interoperable with allies;
- the possibility that smaller nations that are members of the Alliance, such as Croatia, can partially "specialize" in order to be able to contribute to joint operations;
- even greater overall engagement of units and members of the Croatian Armed Forces in collective activities, international missions, and preventive security activities.

The Croatian military significantly expanded during the early 2020s due to the regional Russian invasion of Ukraine in 2022. In 2024, the Croatian Parliament redeployed soldiers to Iraq for non-combat Iraqi counterterrorism support. Croatia's deep integration within Europe and with the U.S. has led to modernization as well as joint procurement of advanced military assets.

The Croatian Parliament reenacted military conscription in 2025.

The Croatian military entered into a regional defence pact with Albania and Kosovo in 2025. Amid the 2026 U.S.-Israeli war in Iran and the related Israeli incursion into Lebanon, the Croatian government preemptively withdrew its troops from Iraq and Lebanon.

== Defence expenditure ==
In the post-war early 2000s, Croatia moderated its military budget to accommodate nation-building. During the wartime 1990s defence represented a major stake in Croatian public spending due to then ongoing Croatian War of Independence. In 1995, the Croatian defence budget stood 10% of gross domestic product (GDP). Since 1995, Croatia has had the third-highest military expenditure per capita in Southeast Europe according to SIPRI. Approximately €1.14 billion was paid in defence pensions to some 97,000 individuals in Croatia in 2024. Military expenditure has increased markedly, rising 22.2% in 2024 and 18.2% in 2025. Croatia brought its defence budget to 2% of GDP in 2025. It intends to grow defence spending to 3% of GDP by 2030, commensurate with economic growth in Croatia. It supports bringing defence spending to 5% by 2035. Nearly 29% of defence spending in 2025 will facilitate military modernization to NATO standards, above the 20% NATO obligation.

The defence expenditures of Croatia, summarized for the following years as a component of GDP:

| Year | Defence expenditure | % of GDP | % change |
|---|---|---|---|
| 2021 | $1.361 billion | 1.95 | ▲38.4 |
| 2022 | $1.285 billion | 1.78 | ▼5.5 |
| 2023 | $1.441 billion | 1.74 | ▲12.1 |
| 2024 | $1.624 billion | 1.81 | ▲12.7 |
| 2025 | $2.052 billion | 2.08 | ▲26.3 |

== Organization ==
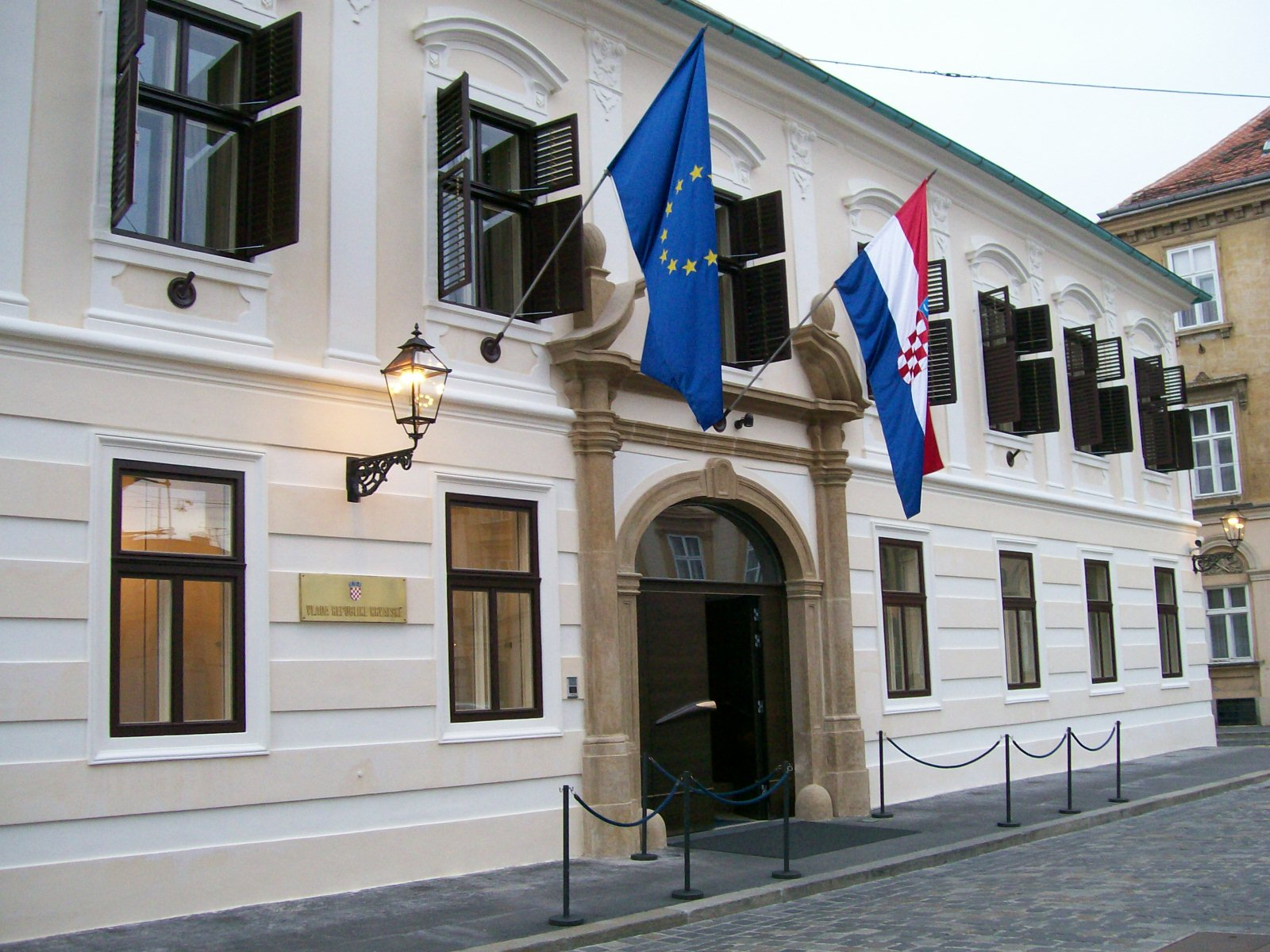
The Government of Croatia oversees its national security.

The Armed Forces are divided into branches, services, professions and their specialties. The President is the Commander-in-Chief and exercises administrative powers in times of war by giving orders to the Chief of Staff, while administration and defence policy execution in peacetime is carried out by the Government through the Ministry of Defence. This unified institution consists of land, sea, and air branches referred to as:

- Croatian Army (Hrvatska Kopnena Vojska - HKoV)
- Croatian Navy (Hrvatska Ratna Mornarica - HRM)
- Croatian Air Force (Hrvatsko Ratno Zrakoplovstvo - HRZ)

The current structure of the Croatian Armed Forces has been in force since 1 December 2014 and consists of the General Staff of the Croatian Armed Forces, Croatian Army (HKoV), Croatian Navy (HRM), Croatian Air Force (HRZ), Croatian defence Academy (HVU), Support Command (ZZP), Special Forces Command (ZSS), Military Disciplinary Court (VSS), Military representations (VP) and Headquarter support units (PP).

- General Staff of the Croatian Armed Forces is a joint body organized within the Ministry of Defence which is responsible for the command, preparation and use of the Armed Forces. General Staff commands the entire Armed Forces in accordance with the dictate of the Commander-in-Chief (President of Croatia) and the Minister of Defence and performs other professional activities for the Commander-in-Chief and the Minister of Defence. It also has a number of units under its direct command, including the ZSS, Honour Guard Battalion and several others.
- Commands of the branches of the Armed Forces are responsible for the functioning of the branches of the Armed Forces and are responsible for the preparation of subordinate commands and units for the execution of tasks. Branch commands participate in the professional development of personnel and are responsible for the training of active and reserve personnel.
- Croatian Defence Academy (HVU), also known as the "Dr. Franjo Tuđman", is a higher educational military institution of the Armed Forces of the Republic of Croatia. It is responsible for the training of individuals for the needs of the entire Croatian Armed Forces. It is located in the "Petar Zrinski" barracks in the Zagreb district of Črnomerec.
- Support Command (ZZP) is the most important part of the logistics system of the Croatian Armed Forces and is responsible for the implementation of logistical, medical and part of personnel support for the Croatian Armed Forces. It's responsible for the acquisition and preparation of all State resources allocated to the Armed Forces and for the overall plan of their use and its applicability to operations on the battlefield.
- Croatian Special Forces Command (ZSS) is one of the three independent commands of the Croatian Armed Forces, subordinate directly to the General Staff of the Croatian Armed Forces. CROSOFCOM mission is to ensure the combat readiness of the special operations forces for operations in defence of the territorial integrity, sovereignty and independence of the Republic of Croatia and to participate in NATO and coalition-led operations.
- Military representations (VP) represent the Armed Forces and carry out their duties, professional tasks related to participation in the work and monitoring the work of departments, working groups, permanent and temporary bodies at the North Atlantic Alliance, European Union and at the Allied Command Operations and the Allied Command Transformation.
- Staff support units (PP) are established for the purpose of developing capabilities for the implementation of various tasks and support activities, which other compositions, due to the specificity or scope, cannot be provided by the Armed Forces within its organic composition. Those units are: Intelligence Center (SOD), Military Police Regiment (PVP), Honor Guard Battalion (PZB), Center for Communication and Information Systems (SKIS), Personnel Management Center (ZUO) and Home of the General Staff of the Armed Forces (DGSOS).

=== Organization chart ===
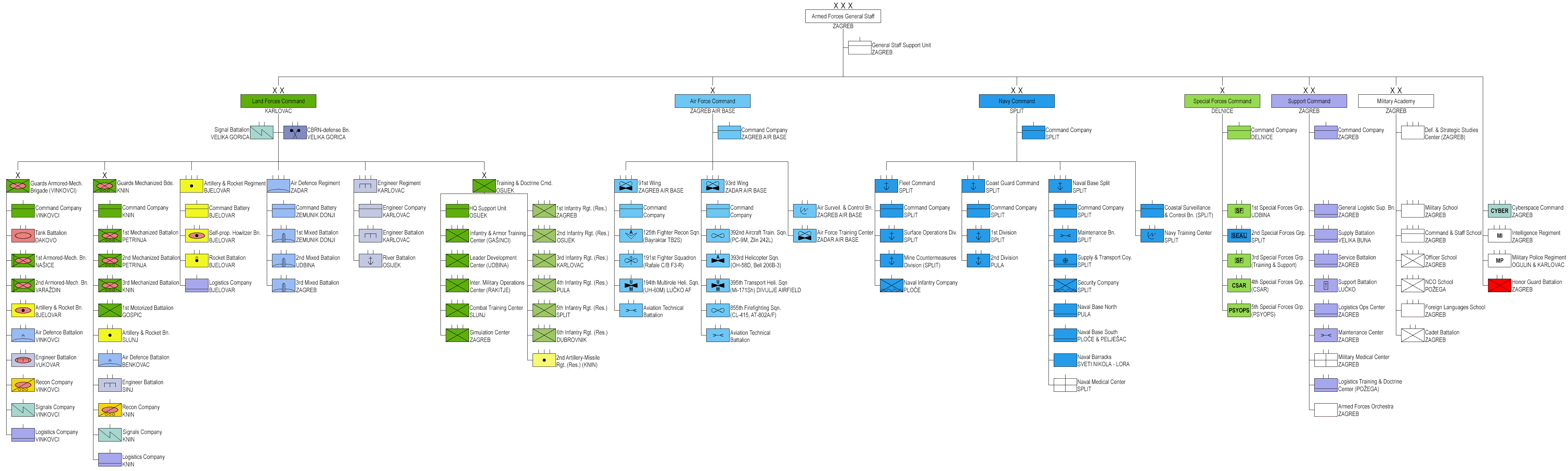
Croatian Armed Forces organization as of April 2026 (click image to enlarge)

== Military assets ==
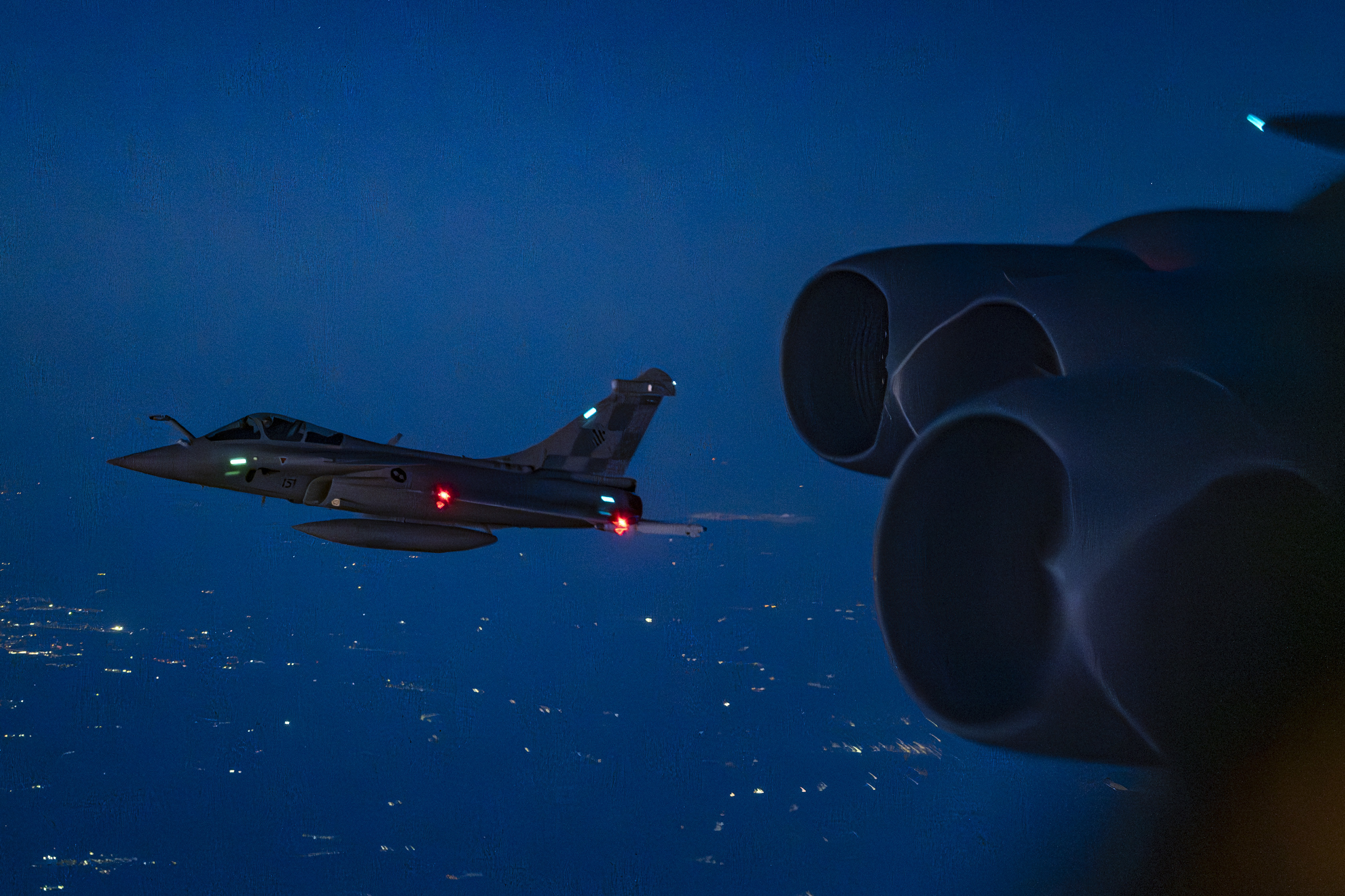
A Croatian Rafale fighter jet in a simulated NATO intercept with the U.S. in 2025

The Croatian Armed Forces maintain a variety of military assets, including weapons, vehicles, aircraft, drones, ships, technology, radar systems, and infrastructure. Croatia has a robust defence industrial base due to its close partnership with the European Union and United States. The Croatian military is among the most technologically-advanced in Southeast Europe. Croatia signed Annex 1-B of the Dayton Agreement in 1996, establishing a regional notification and data exchange program for select military assets. The country is an emerging military supplier to NATO with many of its key military installations on the Adriatic Coast in active use by NATO and the United States Navy. Since Operation Sharp Guard in 1993, the territorial waters of Croatia have been a deterrence asset in Southern Europe for the Croatian Navy and NATO.

The Croatian Army has some of the following military assets: 650 AFVs, around 150 pieces of artillery, 105 MLRSs, 75 tanks, and 25 SPGs. The Croatian Air Force has 12 Dassault Rafale F3-R fighter jets, 8 UH-60 Black Hawk helicopters, d10 Mi-171 combat-transport helicopters and 15 OH-58 Kiowa attack helicopters. The Croatian Navy has 30 ships, out of which five 60-80 metre fast attack craft are used in offensive capabilities. Following the 2022 Zagreb Tu-141 crash, the Croatian military promptly acquired surface-to-air missile (SAM) air defence systems Mistral and VL MICA. From 2024 to 2025, it purchased 50 Leopard 2A8 from Germany as well as additional Black Hawk helicopters, eight HIMARS rocket launchers and 89 Bradley M2A2 tanks from the United States.

Croatia’s has material private sector involvement in the research and development of drone technology used by the Armed Forces. The military has tested Croatian-Estonian technology Vegvisir, a mixed reality digital mapping system that allows for ultra-low latency spatial visibility. It significantly expanded its military drone program through strategic procurements and domestic manufacturing of unmanned aerial vehicles (UAVs) in 2024. During the 1990s the military was known for its covert aerial surveillance drone program, later becoming one of the first countries to use armed drones in active warfare in 1993. Since 2025, it has a planned annual production of 500,000 combat drones as part of broader European and NATO rearmament. Croatian robotics company DOK-ING was contracted by German arms manufacturer Rheinmetall to produce an advanced reconnaissance drone fleet for NATO countries. In 2024, it purchased six armed Bayraktar TB2 drones from Turkey.

== Personnel ==
As of 2024, the Armed Forces had 13,814 active military personnel with 17,352 reservists. Total available male manpower aged 16–49 numbers 1,035,712, of which 771,323 are technically fit for military service. Croatia has had military conscription (for men aged 18 to 28) since 2025, previously enacted from 1991 to 2008.

== Command ==
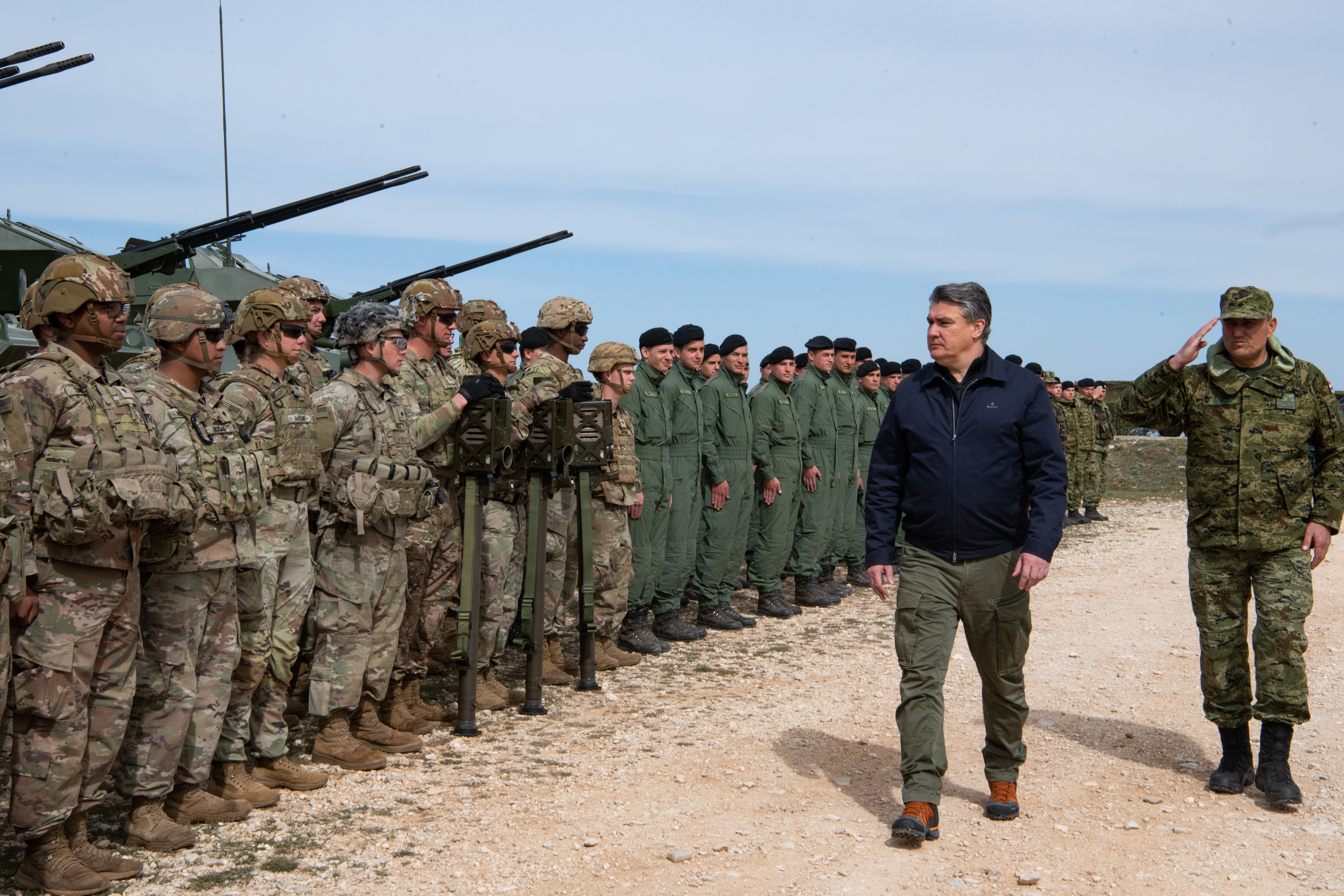
Croatian President Zoran Milanović inspecting Croatian and U.S. troops in 2022

The Commander-in-Chief of the Croatian Armed Forces is the President of Croatia. Command of the Armed Forces in peacetime is exercised by the Commander-in-Chief through the Minister of Defence. In a state of imminent threat and a state of war, the Commander-in-Chief directly issues orders to the Chief of the General Staff. The Croatian Parliament exercises democratic control over the Armed Forces.

Command and direction in the Armed Forces is carried out by officers and non-commissioned officers appointed and assigned to command duties in the Armed Forces. The Command Operations Center (ZOS) is able to activate the entire armed forces within 96 hours.

== International cooperation ==
=== United States ===
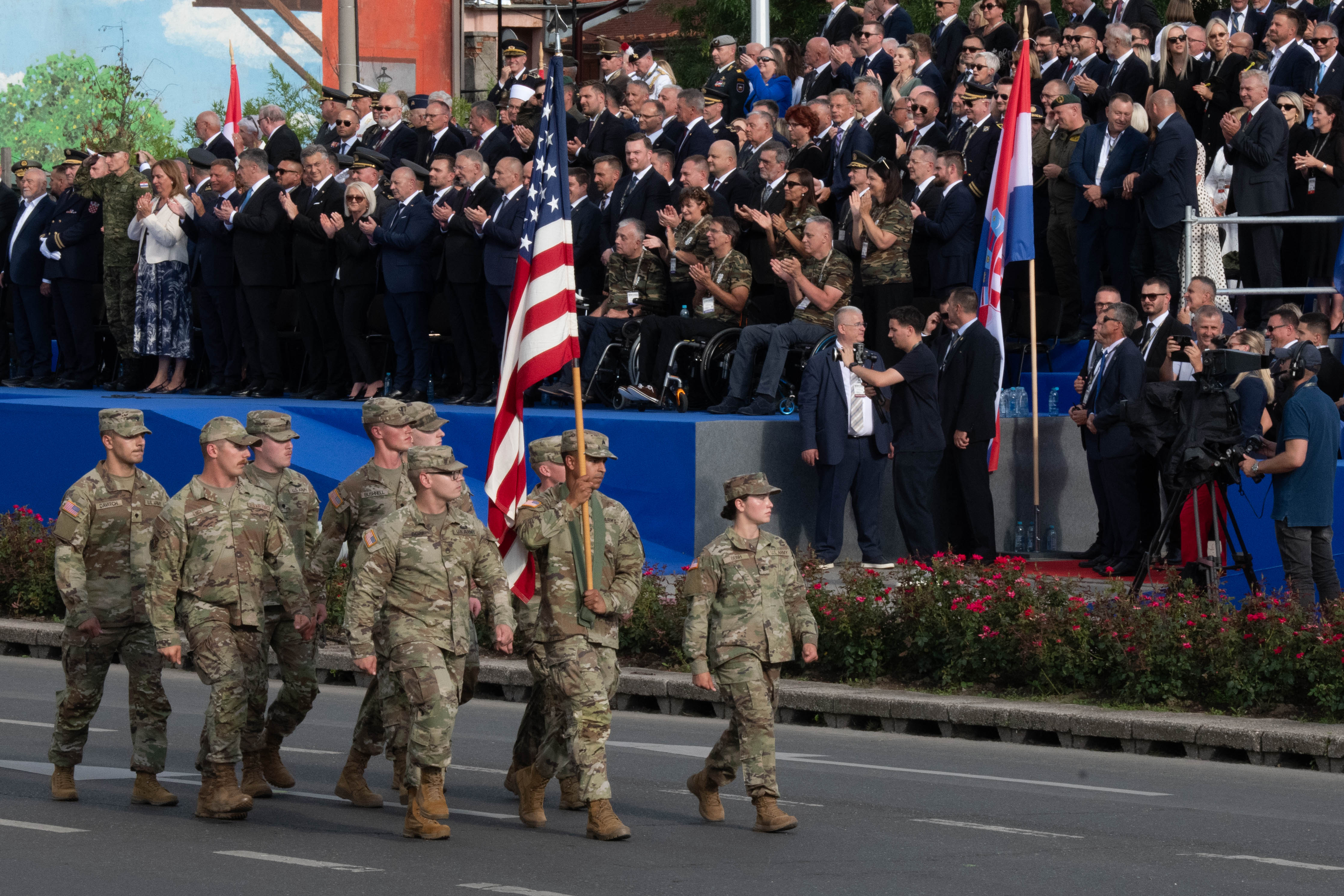
The U.S. Army carrying the American flag through Croatia during a military parade, 2025

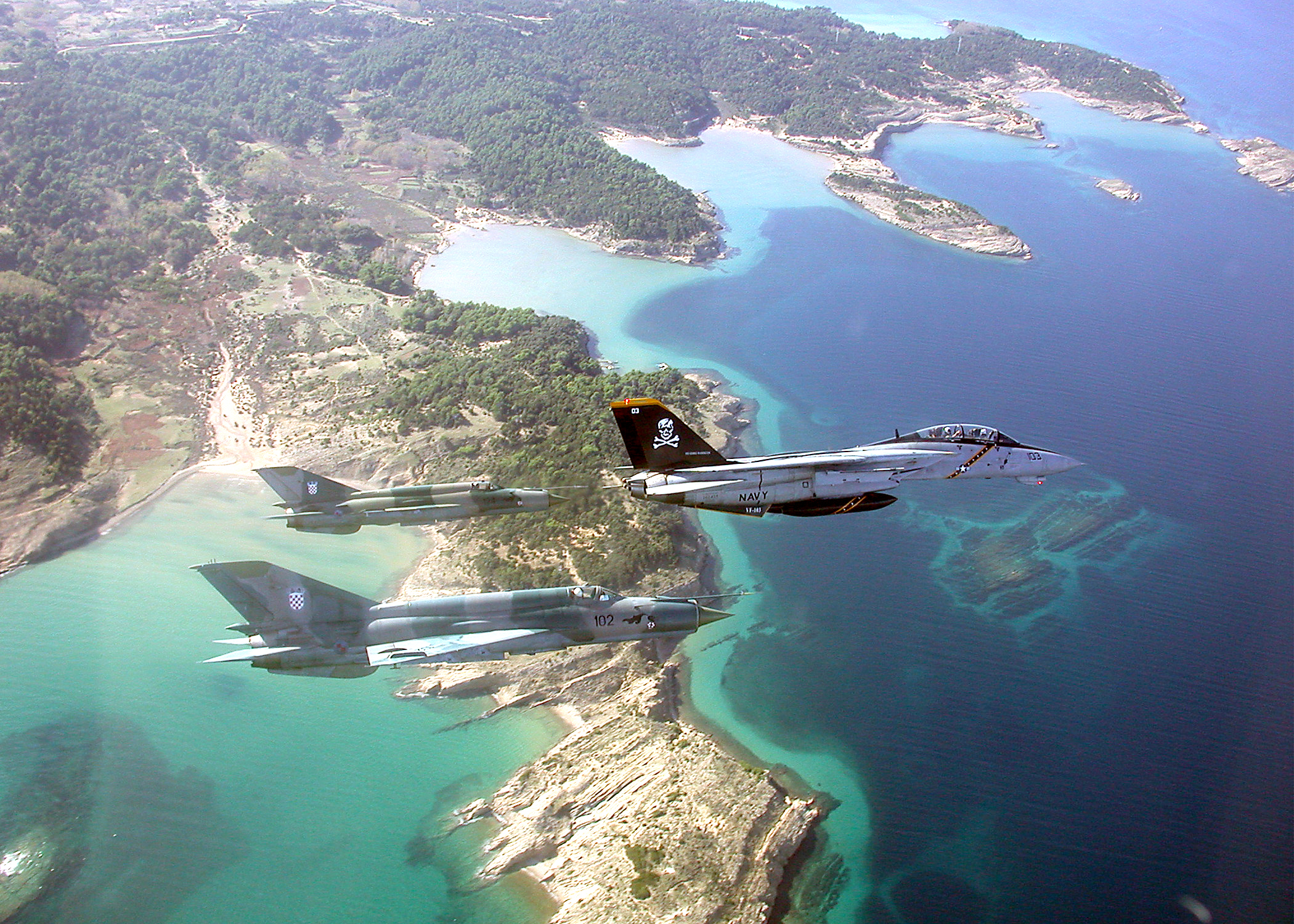
Pair of Croatian MiG-21s and U.S. Navy F-14 over Adriatic Sea, 2002

Croatia and the United States are close military allies and share a robust bilateral defence industrial base. In 1995, the U.S. trained and equipped the Croatian Armed Forces in joint-initiation of Operation Storm during the Croatian War of Independence, securing much of modern Croatian borders. Both are members of NATO, leveraging Croatia's aerospace and defence manufacturing and U.S. military operations to advance multilateral initiatives. Croatia joined the U.S. Armed Forces in Iraq and Kuwait for Operation Inherent Resolve for nearly a decade from 2017 to 2026. After the 2022 Tu-141 drone crash in Zagreb, the U.S. dispatched two F-16 fighter jets in a show of military strength for Croatia. U.S. interests in Croatia are centered on the state's stabilizing influence in the region and extending the global reach of jointly-held Western ideals. Both nations exchange military assets and foreign intelligence. The Croatian diaspora in the U.S. is estimated to be around 1.2 million which, in part, informs the military policy of Croatia. The U.S. and Croatia collaborate on 11 separate military aid programs, funds, and initiatives.

The United States Navy frequently docks naval ships and aircraft carriers in Split, where it maintains a logistical office in the Lora Naval Base. The United States European Command maintains a training facility at this naval base. The Croatian island of Krk has served as a logistics hub for U.S. military supply chains heading to the Middle East. The two nations have deep defence integration and interoperability. The Croatian Armed Forces have a special relationship with the U.S.-based Minnesota National Guard through their State Partnership Program.

=== United Nations ===
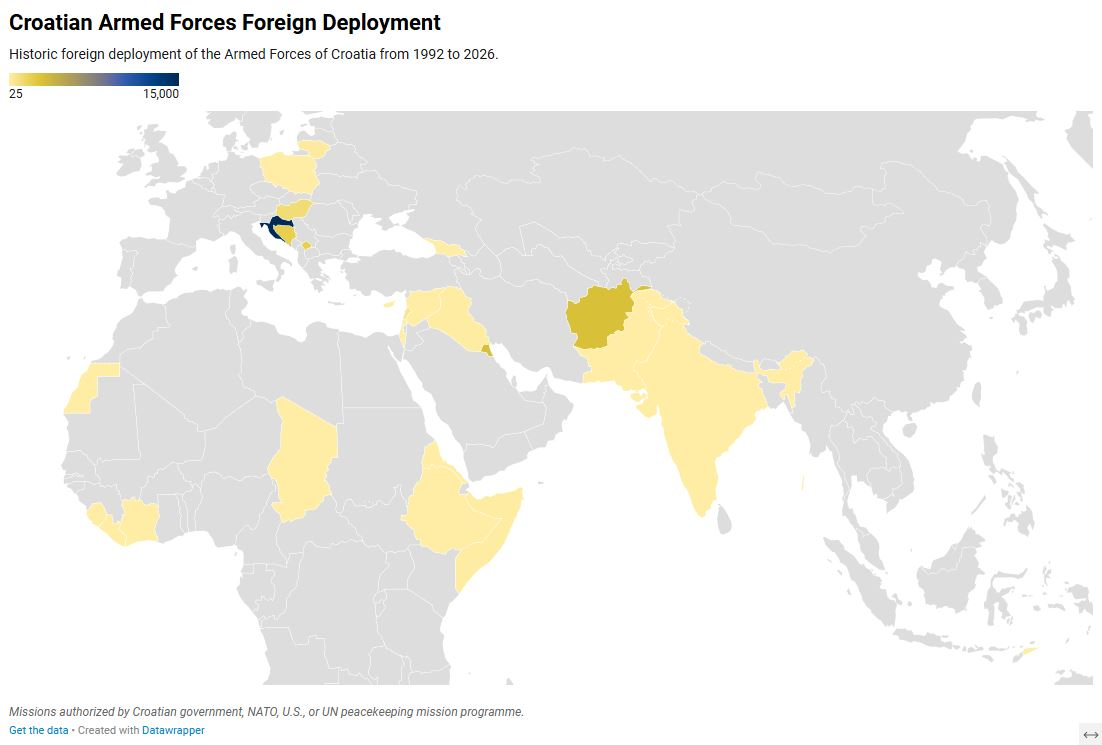
Foreign deployment of the Croatian Armed Forces abroad in military and peacekeeping missions.

The Croatian military began its initial participation in UN peacekeeping missions in 1999 by sending 10 members of the Croatian Armed Forces to Sierra Leone for UNAMSIL as peace observers. Members have similarly been participating in the UNIFIL (United Nations Interim Force in Lebanon) operation since July 2007 as staff officers, and since 2013 as liaison officers. In March 2023, officer of the Croatian Armed Forces was commended by the UNIFIL commander for his assistance in the evacuation of injured soldiers of the Israel Defense Forces due to the activation of a mine explosive device during March 2023.

In October 2008, a reconnaissance team (15 members) were deployed to EU peacekeeping missions (EUFOR) in Chad and the Central African Republic.

=== NATO ===
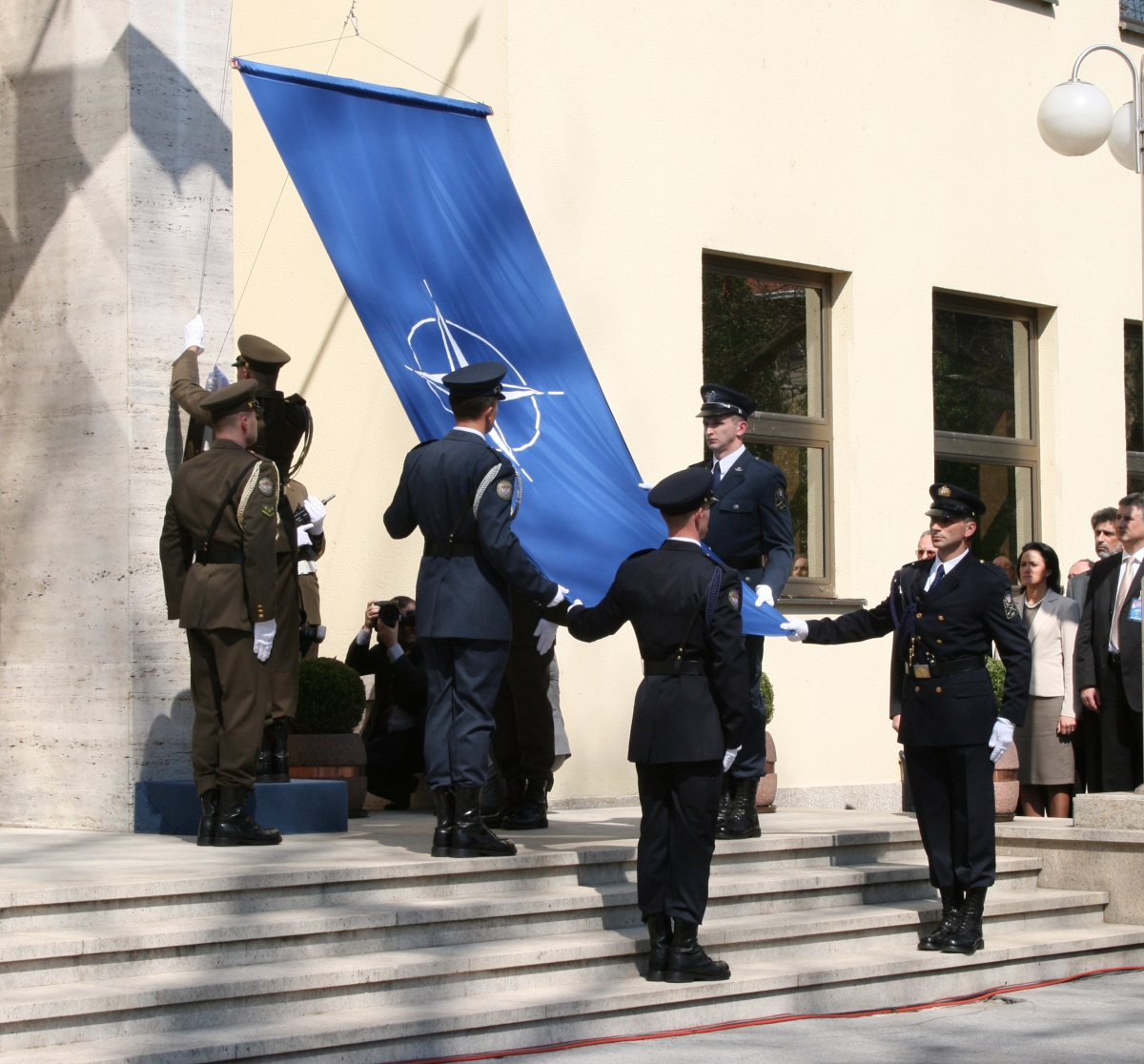
The NATO flag on display in Zagreb, 2009

Croatia has been an active participant in NATO military interventions since February 2003, with an initial deployment of Croatian military police to Afghanistan for NATO's ISAF mission. In July 2009, another deployment of Croatian soldiers were sent to Kosovo, as part of KFOR. Croatia participates in NATO's Enhanced Forward Presence operation in Poland and Lithuania. The first Croatian contingent went to Poland in October 2017, the second in March 2018, and in October of the same year, the 3rd Croatian contingent was deployed to the northeast of Poland to the military training ground "Bemowo Piskie".

As part of the further strengthening of the European deterrence against Russian aggression in Ukraine, NATO launched an enhanced vigilance activity in February 2022, which led to the formation of Croatian battlegroups in Hungary, Slovakia, Romania and Bulgaria in July. The Croatian government provided over €300 million in military aid to Ukraine as part of broader efforts within NATO that year.

=== Foreign engagements ===
The Croatian Armed Forces have been deployed around the world for military engagements, peacekeeping missions, and multilateral campaigns. Since 1999, over 6,000 Croatian troops have participated in foreign military interventions. They have deployed to a variety of NATO, UN, EU, and American-led missions in Europe, the Middle East, and Africa. The largest foreign deployment of Croatian soldiers was to NATO-led International Security Assistance Force Mission (ISAF) and its subsequent Resolute Support Mission (RS) in Afghanistan from 2003 to 2020.

| Current Mission | Organization | Location | Maximum number of personnel (2027) |
|---|---|---|---|
| NATO Enhanced Forward Presence – Battle Group Poland | NATO | Poland | 170 |
| NATO Enhanced Forward Presence – Battle Group Lithuania | NATO | Lithuania | 120 |
| NATO Enhanced Forward Presence – Battle Group Hungary | NATO | Hungary | 220 |
| NATO in Kosovo – KFOR | NATO | Kosovo | 200 |
| Standing NATO Mine Countermeasures Group 2 | NATO | Mediterranean Sea | 5 |
| Operation Sea Guardian | NATO | Mediterranean Sea | 35 |
| European Union Naval Force Somalia – Operation Atalanta | European Union | Somalia | 5 |
| European Union Naval Force Mediterranean – Operation Irini | European Union | Mediterranean Sea | 5 |
| European Union Naval Force Aspides – Operation Aspides | European Union | Red Sea | 5 |
| United Nations Military Observer Group in India and Pakistan – UNMOGIP | United Nations | India and Pakistan | 9 |
| United Nations Peacekeeping Force in Cyprus – UNFICYP | United Nations | Cyprus | 3 |

| Former Mission | Organization | Location |
|---|---|---|
| Operation Inherent Resolve – Combined Joint Task Force (CJTF) | U.S. Armed Forces | Kuwait |
| European Union mission in Chad – EUFOR Tchad/RCA | European Union | Chad |
| European Union Naval Force Mediterranean – Operation Sophia | European Union | Mediterranean Sea |
| Operation Triton | European Union | Mediterranean Sea |
| NATO mission in Iraq | NATO | Iraq |
| International Security Assistance Force – ISAF | NATO | Afghanistan |
| Operation Active Endeavour | NATO | Mediterranean Sea |
| Resolute Support Mission – RS | NATO | Afghanistan |
| United Nations Interim Force in Lebanon – UNIFIL | United Nations | Lebanon |
| United Nations Disengagement Observer Force – UNDOF | United Nations | Golan Heights - Syria and Israel |
| United Nations Mission in Ethiopia and Eritrea – UNMEE | United Nations | Ethiopia and Eritrea |
| United Nations Mission in Liberia – UNMIL | United Nations | Liberia |
| United Nations Mission in Sierra Leone – UNAMSIL | United Nations | Sierra Leone |
| United Nations Mission of Support in East Timor – UNMISET | United Nations | East Timor |
| United Nations Observer Mission in Georgia – UNOMIG | United Nations | Georgia |
| United Nations Operation in Côte d'Ivoire – UNOCI | United Nations | Ivory Coast |
| United Nations Stabilization Mission in Haiti – MINUSTAH | United Nations | Haiti |
| United Nations Mission for the Referendum in Western Sahara – MINURSO | United Nations | Western Sahara |

== See also ==
- Major non-NATO ally
- Defence industry of Croatia
- Split Agreement: a 1995 defence pact with Bosnia and Herzegovina
