= General Staff of the Croatian Armed Forces =

Highest staff organization in the Croatian Armed Forces

General Staff of the Armed Forces
- Glavni stožer Oružanih snaga Republike Hrvatske
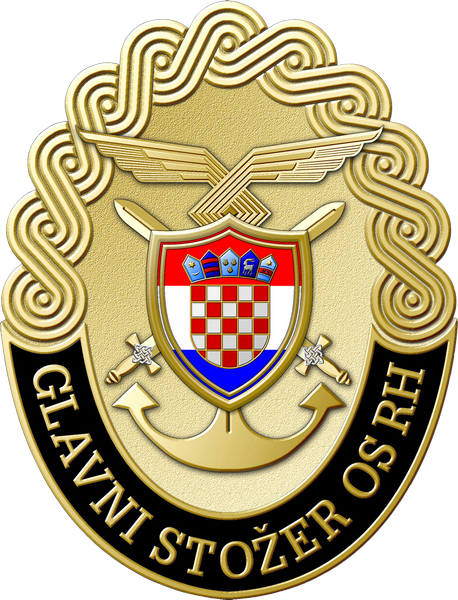
- Croatian General Staff emblem
- Founded: 21 September 1991; 34 years ago
- Country: Croatia
- Type: Staff
- Part of: Armed Forces of Croatia
- Garrison/HQ: Zagreb

Commanders
- Chief of General Staff: Colonel general Tihomir Kundid
- First Chief of General Staff: General of the Army Anton Tus

The General Staff of the Armed Forces of the Republic of Croatia (Croatian: Glavni stožer Oružanih snaga Republike Hrvatske) is a joint body of the Armed Forces of the Republic of Croatia established within the Ministry of Defence, responsible for commanding, preparing and using the Armed Forces. The General Staff of the Croatian Armed Forces enables the command of the entire Armed Forces in accordance with the orders of the Commander-in-Chief and the acts of the Minister of Defence and performs other professional tasks for the needs of the Commander-in-Chief and the Minister of Defence.

== Structure of the General Staff ==
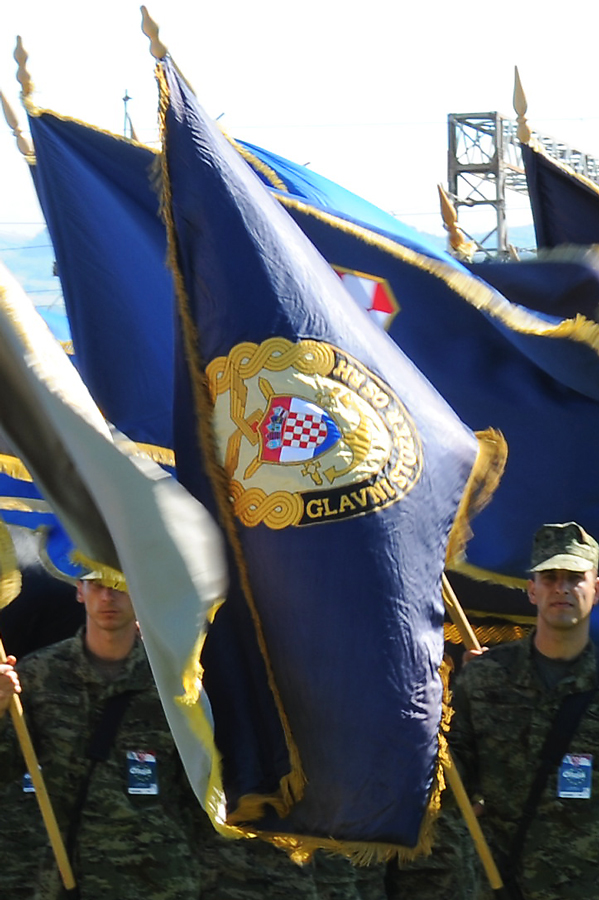
Flag of the General Staff of the Armed Forces.

The organization of the General Staff is dictated by the Commander-in-Chief on the proposal of the Chief of the General Staff and with the consent of the Minister of Defence. The General Staff of the Croatian Armed Force is also a strategic planning body in the field of operational planning. Operational planning means military planning of operations and activities of commands and units of the Croatian Armed Forces. It is carried out on three levels – strategic, operational and tactical. The General Staff is organized in the following organizational units:

=== Chief of the General Staff ===
The Chief of the General Staff of the Croatian Armed Forces is the head of the General Staff, which is superior to the commands, units and institutions of the Armed Forces and the Military Representation of the Republic of Croatia. The Chief of the General Staff is the Chief Military Advisor to the President of the Republic and the Minister of Defence. The Chief of the General Staff is responsible to the President of the Republic for the implementation of orders, and to the Minister of Defence for the implementation of decisions and reports to them on their implementation. In the performance of his duties and tasks, the Chief of the General Staff of the Croatian Armed Forces has directly at the disposal:

- The Director of the General Staff, who is directly superior to the directorates of the General Staff and replaces the Chief of the General Staff in his absence and the absence of the Deputy Chief of the General Staff. The Director of the General Staff is responsible for the Directorates, which are responsible for the doctrinal organization and for directing and supervising the functioning of their functional area.
- Advisor to the Chief of the General Staff for Health, who is the Chief of the General Staff for the field of health care and health support in the Armed Forces and is responsible for the doctrinal arrangement and organization and functioning of the health service in the Armed Forces.
- The First NCO of the Armed Forces is directly responsible to the Chief of the General Staff for the construction and operation of the NCO Corps in the Armed Forces and who participates in directing the professional development of soldiers, sailors and NCOs of the Armed Forces.
- The Cabinet of the Chief of the General Staff shall be established to create the necessary preconditions for the regular performance of the duties of the Chief of the General Staff, the Deputy Chief of the General Staff, the Director of the General Staff, the Health Advisor and the First NCO.
- The Command Operations Centre (ZOS) is responsible for commanding assigned forces in peace support operations abroad and in providing assistance to civil authorities institutions and the population in endangered areas and cases of natural, technical-technological, environmental accidents, search and rescue, fire protection, transport of injured or ill persons in accordance with the approved plans for the use of the Armed Forces and the implementing orders of the Chief of the General Staff, and for drafting orders and other implementing documents necessary for the day-to-day functioning of the Armed Forces. The Command and Operations Center is headed by a commander who exercises command over parts of the Armed Forces in accordance with the assigned authority.
- The Military Police Service (SVP) is responsible for the field of military police affairs. The Military Police Service is headed by the Head of the Service, who manages the Service and organizes and coordinates its work.

In the General Staff structure of the Croatian Armed Forces, there are the following directorates directly responsible to the Director of the General Staff, who supervises and coordinates the work of the directorates. These organizational units are:

- Personnel Directorate (J-1) responsible for the functional area of personnel affairs, training and publishing,
- Intelligence Directorate (J-2) responsible for the functional area of intelligence,
- Operational Directorate (J-3/7) responsible for operations planning, for the functional area of operational affairs, joint doctrines, military exercises and training,
- Logistics Directorate (J-4/8) responsible for the functional areas of logistics (including healthcare) and finance;
- Planning Directorate (J-5/9) responsible for the functional area of long-term planning of the use of forces, resources, international military and civil-military cooperation, as well as for programming and budgeting,
- Directorate for Communication and Information Systems (J-6) responsible for the functional area of communication and information systems (CIS).

== Staff support units of the General Staff ==
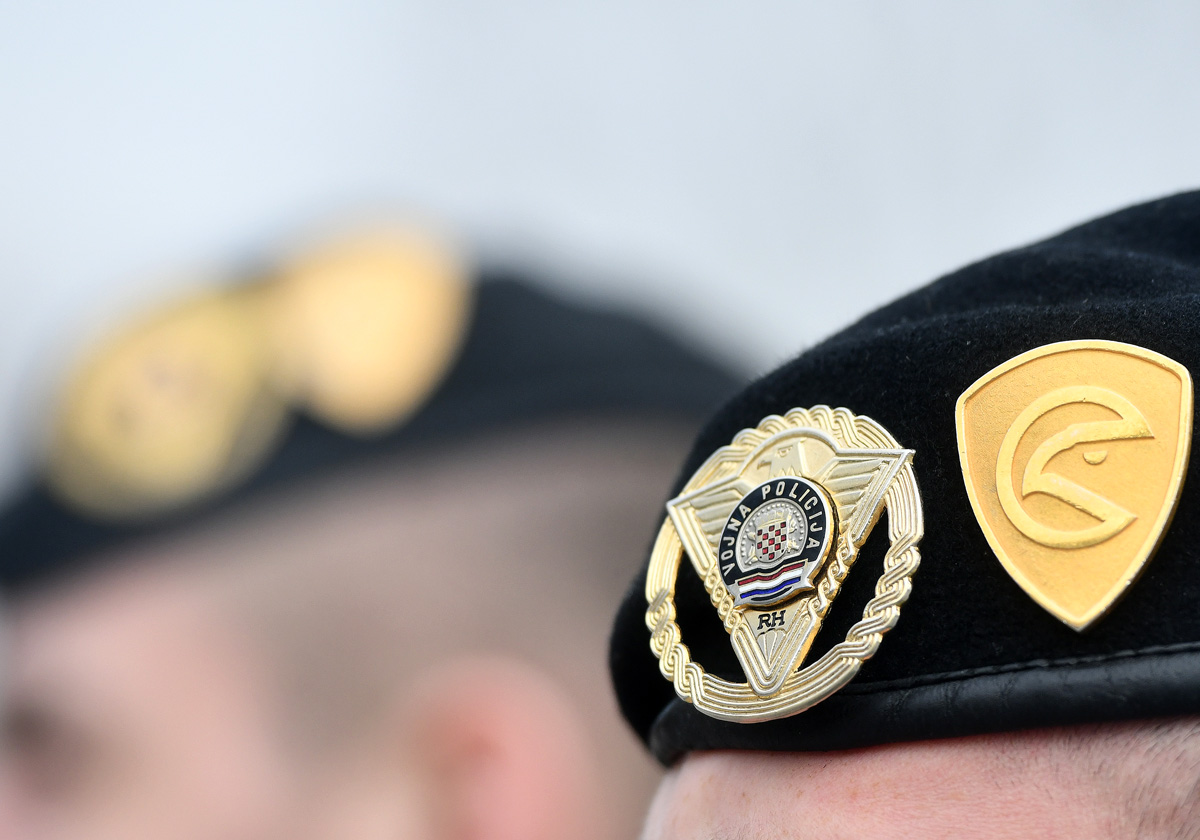
Marking of a Military Police Regiment.

They were established for the purpose of developing capabilities to carry out various tasks and support activities, which other components of the Armed Forces, due to their specificity or scope, cannot provide within the framework of the organic composition. They are directly responsible to its corresponding directorate of the General Staff, and Military Police Service has under its supervision Military Police Regiment. These organizational structures are:

- Intelligence Regiment (OP) provides joint intelligence support to the Armed Forces and other parts of the defence sector in the execution of peacetime tasks, the implementation of war and non-war operations, and is the holder of training and development of military intelligence in the Armed Forces.
- The Military Police Regiment (PVP) performs military police tasks in the Ministry of Defence and the Armed Forces. The Regiment performs tasks of protection of persons, facilities and premises of importance to the Ministry of Defence and the Armed Forces, undertakes preventive and repressive measures in order to prevent criminal offences of misdemeanours and violations of military discipline and official duty, and conducts criminal investigations. The regiment is responsible for the training of the military police and the development of the ability to breed and train military dogs.
- The Honor Guard Battalion (PZB) performs protocol tasks for the needs of the state and military leadership and the tasks of protection and security of the President of the Republic of Croatia.
- Center for Communication and Information Systems (SKIS) provides the technical basis for network-oriented command at the strategic level and administers and protects the key communication and information systems of the Armed Forces. The headquarters is the holder of building the ability to defend the information space in the Armed Forces.
- Personnel Management Center (SUO) carries out the tasks of managing active, conscript and reserve personnel in accordance with the conceptual arrangement of the functional area, primarily in the field of acquisition, deployment and development, and partly in the field of support for personnel in peacetime and in the implementation of war and non-war operations.
- Home of the General Staff of the Armed Forces (DGSOS) provides transport, administrative and logistical support to the General Staff.

The Directorates of the General Staff and the Military Police Service, in accordance with their functional areas, carry out coordination, direction and implementation of joint tasks in accordance with planning documents, as well as supervise the work and activities of headquarters units, according to the following:

- Intelligence Directorate – Intelligence Headquarters (SOD)
- Military Police Service – Military Police Regiment (PVP)
- KIS Directorate – Central Office for Communication and Information Systems (SKIS)
- Personnel Directorate – Personnel Management Headquarters (SUO)
