= Ante Gotovina =

Croatian retired general

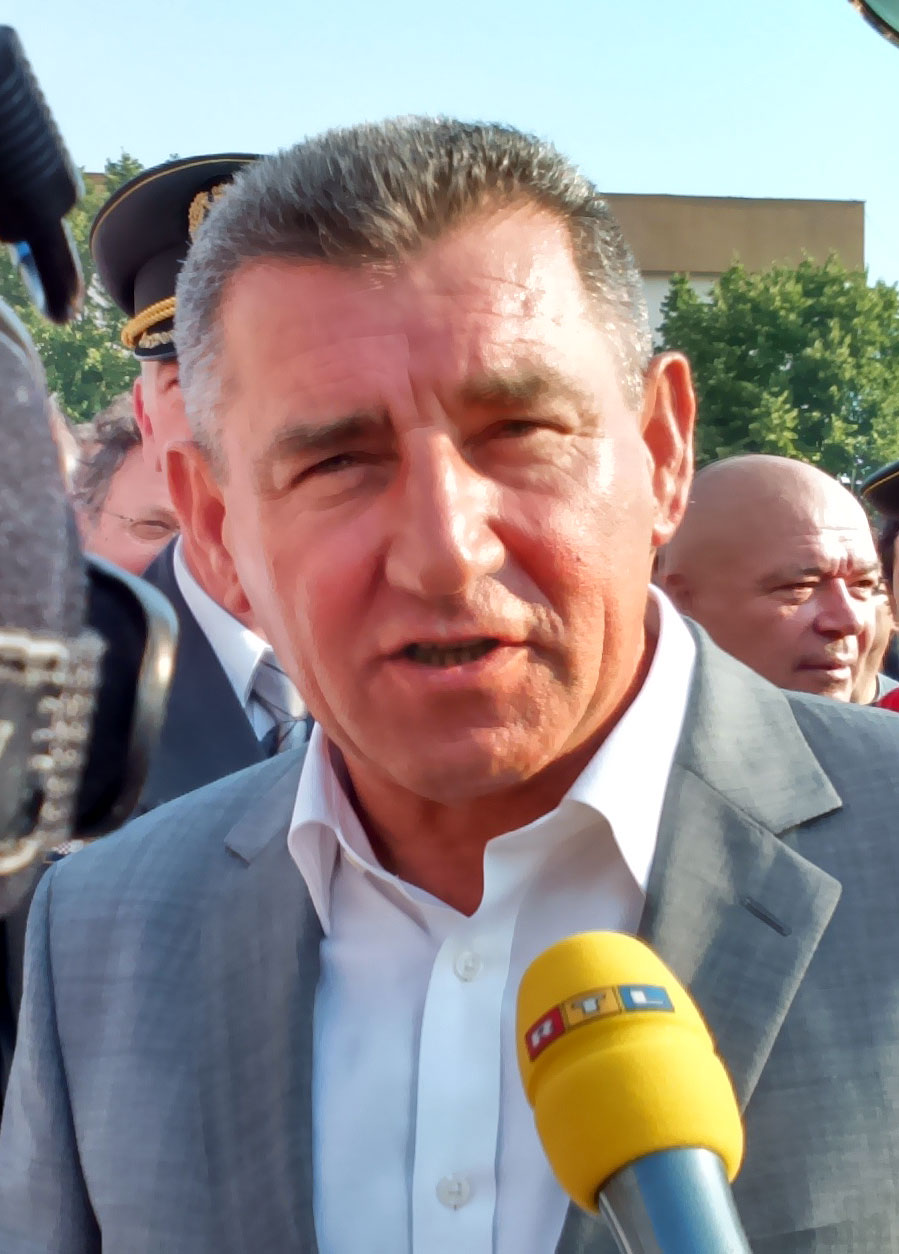
- Gotovina in 2015, at a ceremony marking the 20th anniversary of Operation Storm.
- Born: 12 October 1955 (age 71); Tkon, PR Croatia, FPR Yugoslavia
- Military career
- Allegiance: France (1973–1978); Croatia (1991–2000)
- Branch: French Army; Croatian Defence Council; Croatian Army
- Service years: 1973–2000
- Rank: Caporal-chef (in French Army); Lieutenant General (in Croatian Army)
- Nickname: Andrija Grabovac
- Units: (France) 2nd Foreign Parachute Regiment; (France) Commando Parachute Group; (Croatia) 1st Guards Brigade
- Commands: HVO Livno; Split military district; HV Inspectorate
- Conflicts: Shaba II; Battle of Kolwezi; Yugoslav Wars; Croatian War of Independence; Operation Maslenica; Operation Winter '94; Operation Summer '95; Operation Storm; Bosnian War; Operation Mistral 2; Operation Southern Move
- Awards: Grand Order of King Petar Krešimir IV; Order of Duke Domagoj; Order of Nikola Šubić Zrinski; Order of Ban Jelačić; Order of Ante Starčević; Order of the Croatian Cross; Order of the Croatian Trefoil; Order of the Croatian Interlace; Homeland's Gratitude Medal

Ante Gotovina (born 12 October 1955) is a Croatian retired lieutenant general and former French senior corporal who served in the Croatian War for Independence. He is noted for his primary role in the 1995 Operation Storm. In 2001, the International Criminal Tribunal for the former Yugoslavia (ICTY) indicted him on war crimes and crimes against humanity charges in connection with that operation and its aftermath. After spending four years in hiding, he was captured in the Canary Islands in December 2005. After the 2011 sentence, following an appeal Gotovina was subsequently acquitted and freed of all charges against him in a retrial in November 2012.

On 15 April 2011, Gotovina was found guilty on 8 of the 9 counts of the indictment and sentenced to 24 years of imprisonment. On 16 November 2012, Gotovina's convictions were overturned in a retrial by an appeals panel at the International Criminal Tribunal for the former Yugoslavia (ICTY) and he was released from custody.

== Early life ==
Ante Gotovina was born in Tkon on the island of Pašman. His father Milan tried to move with his mother to Italy, but was caught by the Yugoslav border police. His mother was released while his father spent time in prison. When Gotovina was nearly four, his mother was killed saving him from an explosion at a construction site. Subsequently, his father went to work in Zagreb, while Gotovina and his siblings went to live with their maternal grandfather Šime in Pakoštane. Around Easter of 1971, Gotovina and his friend Srećko tried to escape by sailing away. Rough seas caused by a storm forced them back and they soon returned to Pakoštane. Gotovina kept his escape attempt from his family and continued to attend school for electrical engineering in Zadar.

== French Foreign Legion ==
At the age of sixteen, Gotovina left home to become a sailor. In 1973, before turning eighteen, he joined the French Foreign Legion under the pseudonym of Andrija Grabovac and became a member of the 2nd Foreign Parachute Regiment (2e REP) after qualifying at the Training School in Pau before joining the elite Commandos de Recherche et d'Action en Profondeur (CRAP) now renamed as Parachute Commando Group (GCP). It was there he met Dominique Erulin, brother of the Colonel Philippe Erulin, who became his friend and partner in future missions. In the next few years, he participated in Foreign Legion operations in Djibouti, the Battle of Kolwezi in Zaire, and missions in the Ivory Coast, becoming Colonel Erulin's driver. After five years of service, he left the Legion with the rank of caporal-chef; he obtained French citizenship in 1979.

== Life in France ==
He subsequently worked for a variety of French private security companies during the 1980s, among them KO International Company, a filial or subsidiary of VHP Security, known as a cover for the Service d'Action Civique (SAC), and was at this time responsible for the security of far-right politician Jean-Marie Le Pen. In 1981, together with Dominique Erulin, he helped editor Jean-Pierre Mouchard (a close friend of Jean-Marie Le Pen) organize a commando operation to free his press in La Seyne-sur-Mer, occupied by CGT trade-union strikers.

According to French police records, he became involved in criminal activities, which led to arrest warrants being issued for robbery and extortion; it has been reported that he served at least one two-year prison sentence, though this has been denied by his attorneys.

Towards the end of the decade, he moved to South America, where he provided training to a number of right-wing paramilitary organizations, notably in Argentina and Guatemala. He met his first wife Ximena Dalel in Colombia, and they had a daughter.

Arrested during a trip to France, he was sentenced in 1986 to five years in prison by Paris' Cour d'assises. He was freed the following year, "in circumstances showing he had been benefiting from very particular protections".

Dominique Erulin disputed the verdict against Gotovina and himself, and claims Gotovina's criminal record was manufactured by left-wing factions allied with President François Mitterrand. Gotovina's lawyers submitted a brief to the International War Crimes Tribunal alleging that Gotovina had been framed by an alleged criminal police group loyal to François Mitterrand.

== Croatian War of Independence ==
Gotovina returned to Croatia in 1991, at the dawn of Croatian War of Independence, and enlisted in the Croatian National Guard (ZNG), the first organized military body of what would later become the Croatian Army. He was an efficient commander and had the advantage – shared by relatively few other Croatian soldiers – of combat experience. He fought in western Slavonia: in Novska and Nova Gradiška, attached to the 1st Guards Brigade. He soon caught the attention of his superiors, and when the Croatian Army was established as such in 1992, Gotovina was promoted to the rank of colonel. As a colonel, he was one of the main organizers of Operation Maslenica, which restored Croatia's territorial continuity in Dalmatia.

By 1994, he had risen to the rank of major-general and, as a general-pukovnik and commanding officer of the Split military district he organized key military operations: the defense of Livno and Tomislavgrad from the troops of Bosnian Serb general Ratko Mladić, and the ten-month war of attrition which broke the Serb defenses in the Plain of Livno, the Dinara Ridge and the Šator mountain. He led the conquest of Glamoč and Bosansko Grahovo (Operation Summer '95), which enabled him to close from the east the encirclement of Knin, the capital of the self-declared (1991–95) Republic of Serbian Krajina. This ensured conditions for the rapid success of Operation Oluja ("Storm") in 4–6 August 1995, during which forces under his command captured Knin.

Gotovina was then immediately put in charge of the combined forces of the Croatian Army (Hrvatska Vojska or HV) and the Croatian Defense Council in Bosnia (Hrvatsko Vijeće Obrane or HVO) in Operation Mistral 2, which defeated the army of the Bosnian Serbs and led the Croatian army, together with the Army of Bosnia-Herzegovina, within 23 kilometres of Banja Luka and was only stopped under American pressure.

== Post-war period ==
In 1996, he became the chief of the Army Inspectorate. In September 2000, he was a signatory to the Twelve Generals' Letter in which the government of Ivica Račan was criticised. Together with some of the other generals, he was forced to retire by president Stjepan Mesić, with an explanation that military officers shouldn't write political letters if not approved by the supreme commander.

== War crimes indictment ==
=== Flight and attendant political controversies ===
In July 2001, the International Criminal Tribunal for the former Yugoslavia (ICTY) issued sealed indictments to the Croatian government seeking the arrest of Ante Gotovina and Mladen Markač for war crimes and crimes against humanity allegedly committed between 4 August 1995 and 15 November 1995. Gotovina was indicted together with Markač, a former commander of the special police of Croatia's interior ministry, and Ivan Čermak, assistant defense minister from 1991 to 1993. The three were accused of "aiding and abetting the murders of 324 Krajina Serb civilians and prisoners of war by shooting, burning and/or stabbing" them and "forcibly displacing almost 90,000 Serb civilians". Gotovina was charged with five counts of crimes against humanity (persecutions, deportation, inhumane acts, murder) and four counts of violations of the laws or customs of war (plunder, wanton destruction, murder, cruel treatment). He denied all charges.

For four years, 2001–2005, Gotovina remained at large despite intense pressure from the United States and the European Union for his surrender. Foreign countries sought to hunt down Gotovina, and an Interpol warrant was issued for his arrest. The United States announced a $5 million (€4.2 million) reward for his capture. The British Secret Intelligence Service (MI6) was reported in Croatian media in 2004 to have been allowed to import sophisticated monitoring equipment to track down Gotovina. This caused resentment among elements of Croatia's security establishment; as a result, MI6 officers based in Croatia under cover were exposed in the Croatian media, allegedly at the behest of Gotovina's sympathisers in Croatia's counter-intelligence service, the POA (Protuobavještajna agencija). Prior to that, a number of Croatian security officials were sacked, including POA head Franjo Turek, who was replaced by Joško Podbevšek and shortly afterwards by Tomislav Karamarko. The wiretapping operation went ahead after Turek's retirement in March 2004, under his successor at the POA, but failed to locate Gotovina before a deadline set by the Croatian prime minister Ivo Sanader in June 2004. According to a leaked memo from MI6 to the POA, the UK government had called for Turek's arrest, unless he started to cooperate on Gotovina.

Several EU member states, including the UK and the Netherlands, made the surrender of Gotovina a precondition for Croatia's accession to the European Union. This stance was criticised by the Croatian government, which claimed ignorance of Gotovina's whereabouts but that he was probably outside the country and that it was doing all it could to bring him to justice. Accession negotiations with the EU, scheduled to start on 17 March 2005, were postponed pending a resolution of the issue.

In September 2005, ICTY's chief prosecutor Carla Del Ponte claimed she had information that he was hiding in a Franciscan monastery in Croatia or in Bosnian Croat territory. She went to the Vatican to ask for help in locating him, but told The Daily Telegraph that the Vatican Secretary for Relations with States, Archbishop Giovanni Lajolo, had refused to help, telling her that the Vatican was not a state and thus had "no international obligations". Her comments infuriated the Church in Croatia as well as the Vatican, whose spokesman Joaquín Navarro-Valls said the archbishop asked Del Ponte what evidence she had for her claims but which she reportedly did not provide.

=== Capture and extradition ===
On 7 December 2005, Gotovina was captured by Spanish police and special forces in the resort of Playa de las Américas on Tenerife in the Canary Islands. He was reported to have been traveling on two fake Croatian passports using the names, Goran Drozdek and Stjepan Seničić. His passport contained border stamps of several countries, including Argentina, Chile, Russia, China, Czech Republic and Tahiti. A sum of money amounting to €12,000 was discovered in his room. He was immediately flown to Madrid, where he was imprisoned in advance of a court hearing to extradite him to the ICTY prison at The Hague. Spanish police were later reported to have been tracking him for several days, apparently following a lead obtained through the wiretapping of his wife Dunja's phone.

The involvement of Croatian authorities was backed up by the Carla's List documentary, a part of which is available on YouTube. Croatian media credited Josip Buljević (subsequently the SOA's director, later president Kolinda Grabar-Kitarović's national security advisor and since January 2016 defence minister) with being in charge of the operation to locate and arrest Gotovina.

On 10 December 2005, Gotovina was flown to The Hague, where he appeared before the ICTY on 12 December. He pleaded not guilty to the seven charges brought against him, for acting individually and/or through a joint criminal enterprise in persecutions, deportation and forced displacement and other inhumane acts for a total of four counts of crimes against humanity; and murder, plunder of property and wanton destruction of settlements in three counts of violations of the laws or customs of war. According to his lawyer, Gotovina has declared that he is "not the man described in each and every count."

=== Reactions ===
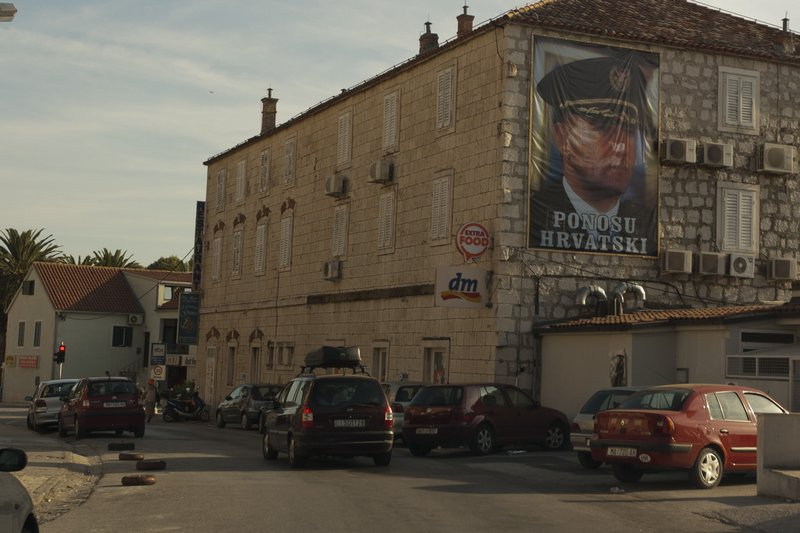
"Croatian pride", Makarska centre, September 2011

Many Croats continued to regard Gotovina as a war hero and rejected the assertion that he was guilty of crimes. Major parties in Croatia were reported to be using Gotovina as a means of drumming up political support in the run-up to the 2007 parliamentary election.

During his flight, Gotovina became a prominent icon of Croatian popular culture. Marko Perković and Miroslav Škoro, two popular Croatian musicians, recorded songs with lyrics implicitly praising the general and his flight, and both songs became huge hits, especially among younger fans. In 2006, the two most popular football teams in the country, Dinamo Zagreb and Hajduk Split, played a match, whose proceeds went to help finance the generals' legal fees.

In March 2005, a survey conducted on behalf of the U.S. Embassy in Croatia reported that a majority of those surveyed thought it was not in Croatia's interest to extradite Gotovina. Unofficial polls by television programs also showed strong support, with most callers saying that they would prefer Gotovina remain at large even if it meant not joining the European Union.

In 2001, the Croatian writer Nenad Ivanković wrote a biography of Gotovina, Warrior-Adventurer and General (A Biography). The Croatian filmmaker Dejan Šorak wrote and directed Two Players from the Bench (Dva igrača s klupe), a black comedy released in 2005 whose plot was inspired by the events surrounding the indictments against Gotovina. Jack Baric, an Emmy Award winning Croatian-American filmmaker made Searching for a Storm, a documentary film about Gotovina's case and the war in Croatia. The film had its world premiere in 2009 at the Zagreb Dox Film Festival.

After Gotovina's arrest in Spain, several rallies and protests took place in Croatian cities. On 11 December 2005 (the first Sunday after his arrest), a rally organised by war veterans attracted between 40,000 and 70,000 Croatians in the city of Split to protest the arrest. Several retired generals attended the rally and expressed their support for Gotovina. On the same day, rallies were held in several other cities in Croatia, but with smaller attendance (in Zagreb some 500 people gathered).

Polls taken by the PULS Agency after Gotovina's arrest showed that almost two-thirds of the Croatian public found the accusations baseless.

== Trial ==
At the end of 2006, Gotovina's case was combined with cases of Ivan Čermak and Mladen Markač, as they all relate to Operation Storm. The Trial of Gotovina et al was expected to begin in May 2007 but was postponed indefinitely because of conflicts between lawyers on the defence bench. His lawyers were Luka Misetic, an American attorney of Croatian descent, Greg Kehoe, an American lawyer who advised the prosecution in the Iraqi Special Tribunal case against Saddam Hussein, and Payam Akhavan, former Legal Advisor to the Prosecutor's Office of the ICTY.

After the 2006 death of Slobodan Milošević, Gotovina signed a condolence note to his family (together with Mladen Naletilić Tuta, Ivica Rajić and other Croat and Serb detainees, making the list 34 signatures long), which was published in Belgrade's Politika and Večernje novosti newspapers. Gotovina's attorney stated that he signed because of his Catholic faith, which stresses forgiveness.

The trial began on 11 March 2008, and it concluded in September 2010 with the delivery of closing arguments. Misetic said that he expected a verdict in two to 10 months' time, as had been the case with the tribunal's decisions to date.

=== First-degree verdict ===
On 15 April 2011, Gotovina was found guilty on 8 of the 9 counts of the indictment and sentenced to 24 years of imprisonment.

He was convicted of "committing war crimes and crimes against humanity, including murder, deportation, persecution and inhuman acts" and Presiding Judge Alphons Orie cited several witness testimonies in the decision.

In the Gotovina Defence Final Trial Brief, a 315-page document, Gotovina's lawyers rejected the accusation of mass expulsion of Serbian population as well as the accusation of unlawful shelling of civilian areas, saying that the "HV used artillery solely against military objectives in a highly professional operation consistent with well-established military doctrine".

In Zagreb, Croatia's capital, thousands gathered to watch the sentence being given out live on large screens and loudly protested the decision. Croatian prime minister Jadranka Kosor stated the idea of a "joint criminal enterprise" was "unacceptable". War veterans staged a march in the Croatian capital in protest. About 10,000 showed up to the march, chanting slogans against the Kosor-led government and the EU as protesters removed and ripped apart the EU flag from a flagpole at the main square, replacing it with the Croatian flag.

A poll conducted immediately after the verdict showed that 95.4% of Croatians felt the judgment against Gotovina was unjust and that 88% still saw him as a hero. Support for Croatia's entry into the European Union plummeted to 23.8%. In June 2011, Gotovina was ranked the second most creditable person for the creation of an independent Croatian state in a poll conducted by Večernji list.

=== Appeal verdict ===
On 16 November 2012, Gotovina was found not guilty by three votes against two by the Appeals Panel of the ICTY, presided over by Theodor Meron. The previous verdict had sentenced him to 24 years in prison while Mladen Markač was sentenced to 18 years. Both of them were accused of being part of the "criminal enterprise" but the Court concluded there was no such conspiracy.

On 15 November, the night before the verdict, candle-lit vigils were held across Croatia, including at Catholic churches. Gotovina and Markač were supported by numerous Croatian veterans, and some marched from Zagreb's Mirogoj cemetery to the Zagreb Cathedral.

Gotovina's acquittal provoked mixed international reactions. Croatian Prime Minister Zoran Milanović reacted positively, as did the Croatian president Ivo Josipović.

Serbian President Tomislav Nikolić reacted negatively, as did Serbian government minister Rasim Ljajić and Prime Minister Ivica Dačić and much of the Serbian media.

The Serbian government froze its relations with the Tribunal. On the other hand, Veselin Šljivančanin congratulated the generals on their release and blamed the political leaders instead.

Reactions in Bosnia and Herzegovina were mixed: positive reactions came from the President of the Federation of Bosnia and Herzegovina Živko Budimir and Bosnian Croat politician Dragan Čović, while the President of Republika Srpska Milorad Dodik responded negatively.

The case raised significant issues for law of war and it has been described as a precedent. Carla del Ponte, former Chief Prosecutor of ICTY, was described as shocked by the verdict. Ivan Šimonović, former Croatian minister of justice and current UN Assistant Secretary-General for human rights, said that the verdict would have an important role in interpretation of some regulations of international criminal law. Serbian politician Vuk Jeremić, President of the UN General Assembly, criticized the ICTY on Twitter. and in response scheduled a UN GA session to discuss the work of the ad-hoc Tribunals set up by UN.

Frederik Harhoff, a Danish judge at the ICTY, suspected that ICTY President Theodor Meron, the American judge of the majority, had exerted pressure on the other two judges of the majority to not convict Gotovina, since his conviction would set a precedent in which international criminal law would become too capable of holding senior military commanders responsible for crimes committed by their forces, something that would jeopardize commanders of the United States.

== After release ==
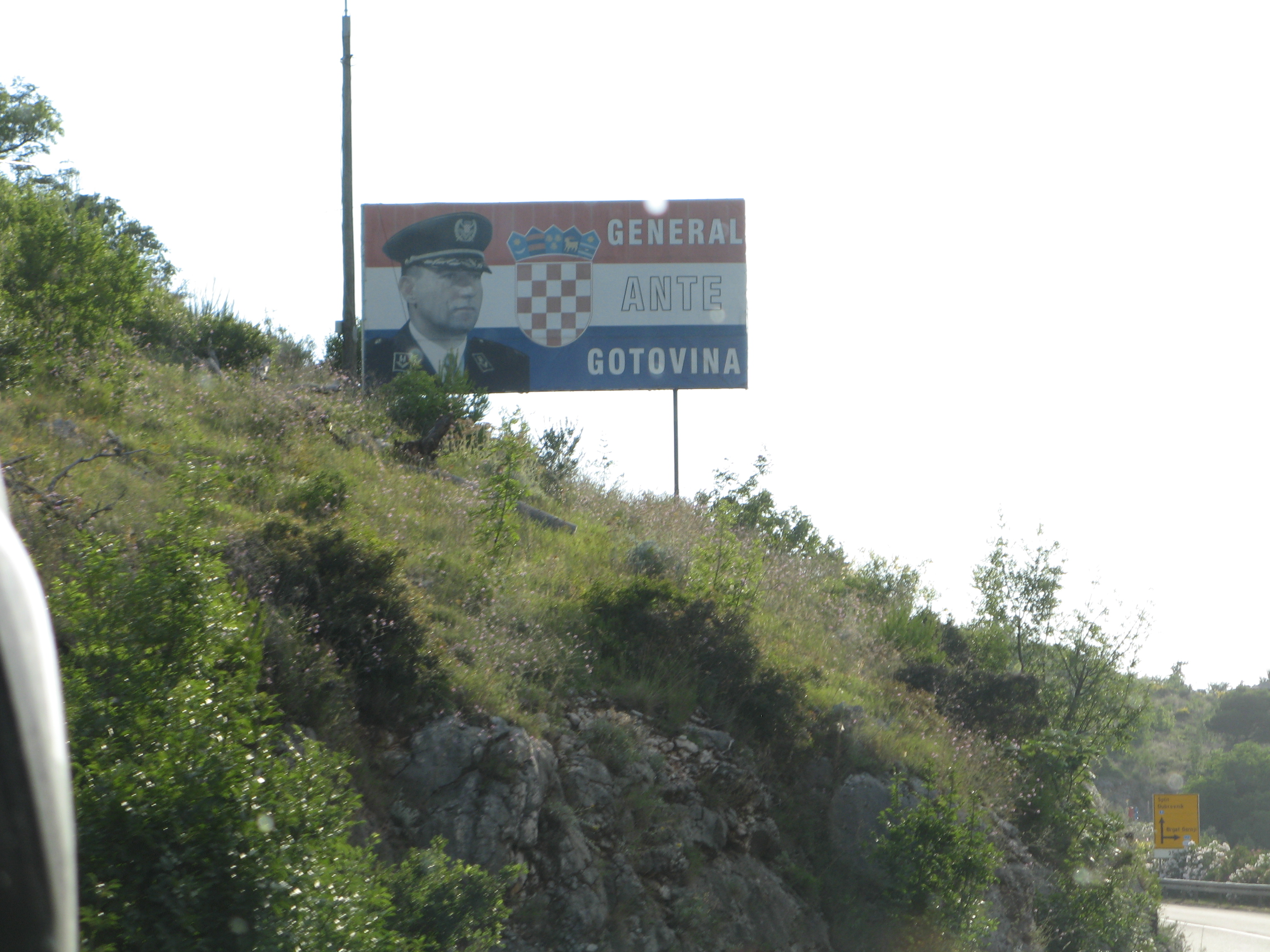
A billboard showing a picture of Ante Gotovina on a road near Dubrovnik.

After the generals' release, the Croatian government dispatched the governmental Bombardier Challenger 600 plane along with the Minister of Defence, Ante Kotromanović, and the Minister of Veterans' Affairs, Predrag Matić, to bring Gotovina and Markač to Croatia. In Zagreb, they were greeted by Prime Minister Zoran Milanović and the Speaker of Parliament Josip Leko. Around 100,000 people heard them speak at the Ban Jelačić Square, after which Cardinal Josip Bozanić held a mass for them at the Zagreb Cathedral. The two generals were then received by the President at the Presidential Palace where Gotovina said that the "Homeland War is now clean, it belongs to our history, it is a basis on which we build our future."

Matić said that Gotovina and Markač are amongst the candidates for a new highest Croatian decoration.

On 19 November 2012, the Belgrade-based tabloid Kurir ran an interview with Gotovina, who urged Serbs displaced after Operation Storm to return to Croatia.

On 23 November 2012, Gotovina became an honorary citizen of Split and the next day he became an honorary citizen of Zadar. On 2 December he was named honorary citizen of Osijek along with Markač.

In November 2012, Serbia's government requested that the ICTY transfer the evidence against both generals to them for their own investigation. In January 2013, Serbia's War Crimes Prosecutor Vladimir Vukčević said that the acquittal was final and a review of the case was impossible.

On 7 January 2014, it was announced that Gotovina had filed a lawsuit against the U.S. Department of Treasury to lift economic sanctions imposed against him, which had been in place for more than a decade, listing Gotovina as a Specially Designated National in 2003, subject to economic sanctions. On 6 February, the Federal Register announced Gotovina's removal from the list.

In 2019, The General, a biographical film about Gotovina's life based on Nenad Ivanković's book Warrior-Adventurer and General (A Biography) was released. It was directed by Antun Vrdoljak and starred Goran Višnjić as Gotovina.

== Acknowledgements ==
- City of Zadar Award (2011)

== Bibliography ==
- Ivanković, Nenad (2001). Ratnik: pustolov i general (jedna biografija). Zagreb: Honos. ISBN 953-98429-0-5.

Military offices
New office	Commander of the Split Military District; 1992–1996	Unknown
