= Orders, decorations, and medals of Croatia =

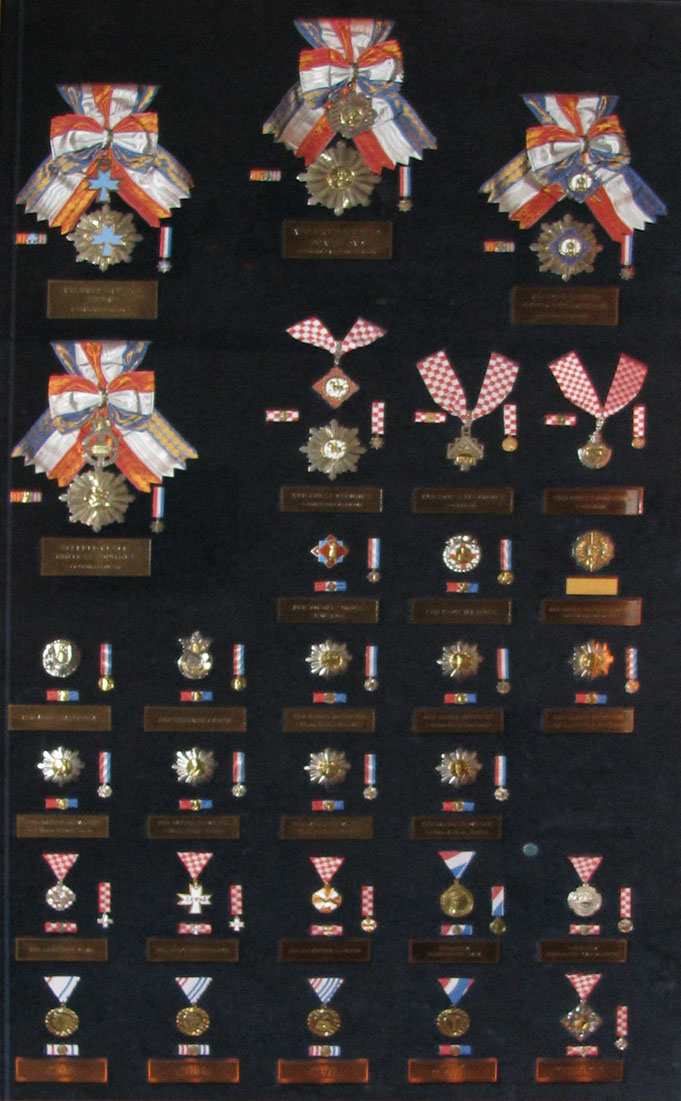
Orders, decorations, and medals of Croatia

The system of honours of the Republic of Croatia was established after the independence of Croatia in 1991. There are nineteen main decorations conferred since 2019, in addition to several other medals and awards.

The President of the Republic of Croatia confers decoration and awards of the Republic of Croatia on their own initiative or at the suggestion of the State Commission for Decorations and Awards. Decorations and awards can be conferred on Croatian or foreign nationals, legal entities as well as units of the Armed Forces of the Republic of Croatia and the Ministry of the Interior.

== Velered - Red - Spomenica ==
The orders, decorations, and medals currently authorized are listed below in their order of precedence. Some orders were instituted in 1992.

Grand Order - Order - Commemorative Medal (Croatian: Velered - Red - Spomenica)
	Grand Order of King Tomislav (Velered kralja Tomislava)
	Grand Order of Queen Jelena (Velered kraljice Jelene)
	Grand Order of King Petar Krešimir IV (Velered kralja Petra Krešimira IV.)
	Grand Order of King Dmitar Zvonimir (Velered kralja Dmitra Zvonimira)
	Grand Order of Franjo Tuđman (Velered Franje Tuđmana)
	Order of Duke Trpimir (Red kneza Trpimira)
	Order of Duke Branimir (Red kneza Branimira)
	Order of Duke Domagoj (Red kneza Domagoja)
	Order of Nikola Šubić Zrinski (Red Nikole Šubića Zrinskog)
	Order of Ban Jelačić (Red bana Jelačića)
Medal only	Order of Petar Zrinski and Fran Krsto Frankopan (Red Petra Zrinskog i Frana Krste Frankopana)
	Order of Ante Starčević (Red Ante Starčevića)
	Order of Stjepan Radić (Red Stjepana Radića)
7 variants	Order of Danica Hrvatska (Red Danice hrvatske)
	Order of the Croatian Cross (Red hrvatskog križa)
	Order of the Croatian Trefoil (Red hrvatskog trolista)
	Order of the Croatian Interlace (Red hrvatskog pletera)
	Commemorative Medal of the Homeland War (Spomenica Domovinskog rata)
	Commemorative Medal of the Homeland's Gratitude (Spomenica domovinske zahvalnosti)

Orders and decorations are for merit in establishing, maintaining and promoting an autonomous, independent and sovereign Republic of Croatia, merit in the realization of the Croatian nation-building idea and the development and construction of the Republic of Croatia, and for exceptional courage and heroism in war, in immediate war danger or in special peacetime circumstances.

== Medalja ==
In addition to the orders and decorations above, Croatia has also established various medals for long service, etc., as well as a series of commemorative medals for the military campaigns in 1995. Among these are:

- Medal for Participation in Operation Flash (Medalja za sudjelovanje u operaciji "Bljesak")
- Medal for Participation in Operation Summer '95 (Medalja za sudjelovanje u operaciji "Ljeto '95")
- Medal for Participation in Operation Storm (Medalja za sudjelovanje u operaciji "Oluja")
- Medal for Exceptional Undertakings in Maintaining the Constitutional and Legal Order of the Republic of Croatia and Protecting Citizens' Lives and Property.

Medals are awarded "to members of the active and reserve components of the armed and police forces of the Republic of Croatia for participation in certain military-police operations and to individuals for exceptional undertakings."

== Government awards ==
State ministries grant or sponsor various other top-level annual awards, most notably the Croatian State Award (Croatian: Državna nagrada) each year to Croatian citizens who have excelled in a specific field. Key awards include:

- Vladimir Nazor Award - Awarded for achievements in literature, music, film, applied art, theater art, architecture and urbanism.
- Ivo Horvat Award - Awarded for work in nature conservation.
- Franjo Bučar State Award for Sport - Awarded for achievements in sport.
- Vicko Andrić Award - Awarded for achievements in the field of cultural heritage protection in Croatia.
- State Award for Technical Culture "Faust Vrančić" - Awarded to individuals, associations and other legal entities for exceptional achievements in the field of technical culture.
- State Award for Science - Awarded for exceptionally important achievements in scientific research.

== Presidential awards ==
- Charter of the Republic of Croatia
