= Josip Lucić =

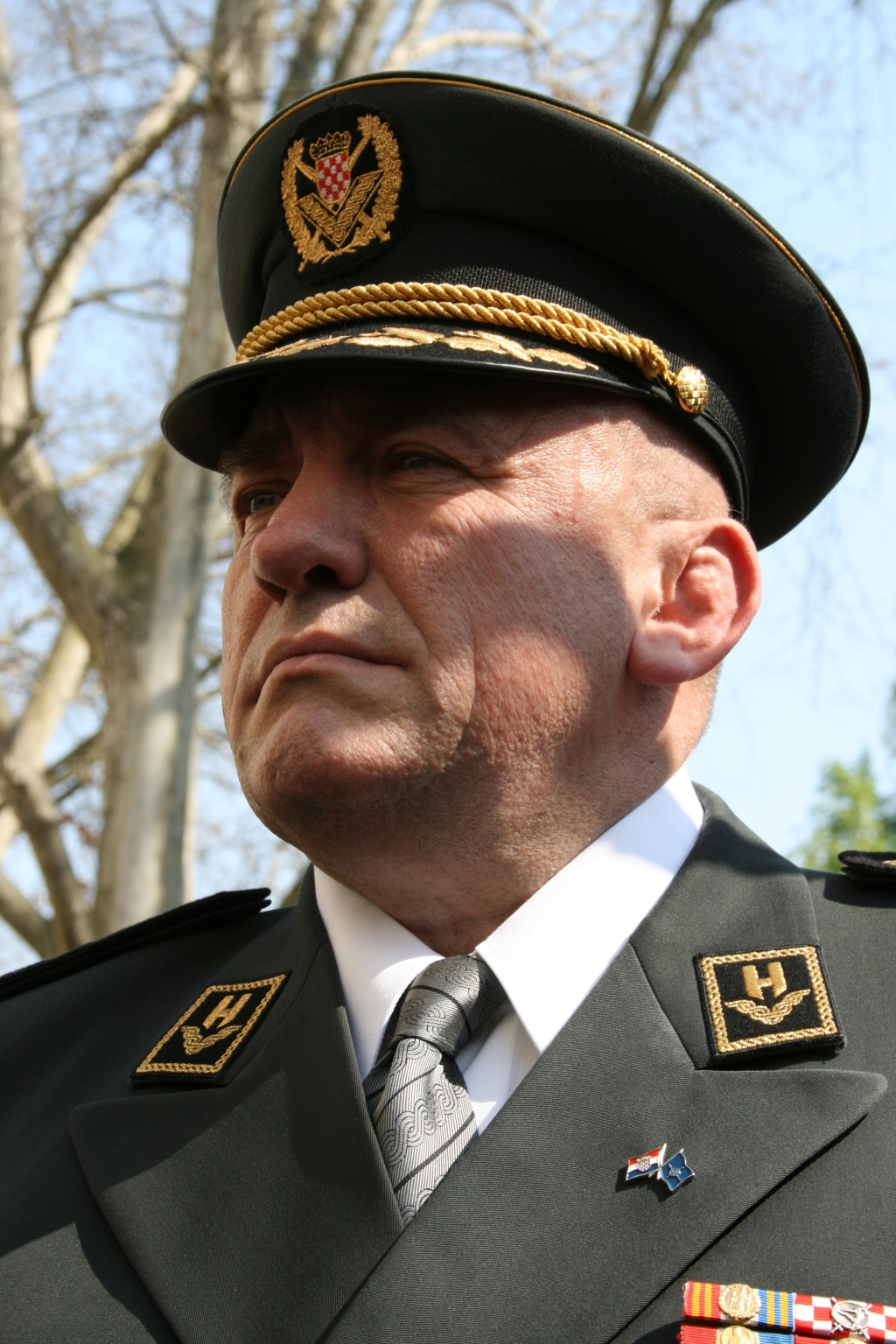
- Lucić on 7 April 2009
- Born: 26 April 1957 (age 69); Posavski Podgajci, PR Croatia, FPR Yugoslavia (modern Croatia)
- Military career
- Allegiance: Croatia
- Branch: Croatian Army
- Service years: 1990–2011
- Rank: General
- Commands: 1st Guards Brigade "Tigers"; General Staff of the Croatian Armed Forces
- Conflicts: Croatian War of Independence
- Awards: Grand Order of King Petar Krešimir IV; Legion of Merit

Josip Lucić (born 26 April 1957) is a Croatian general and former chief of General Staff of the Armed Forces of the Republic of Croatia.

== Youth ==
Lucić was born in Posavski Podgajci near Drenovci on 26 April 1957. He finished elementary and high school in Zagreb. In 1984 he graduated at Faculty of Kinesiology of University of Zagreb, and in 1988 he became master of kinesiology.

== Military career ==
In November 1990, Lucić voluntarily joined the units of the Croatian Ministry of Interior, where he became the Deputy Commander of the Special Battalion "Rakitje" and later Commander of the same battalion. He was also involved in the formation of an anti-terrorist police battalion. From May to December 1991, he was the Commander of 1st Guards Brigade "Tigers". As a Commander of the 1st Croatian National Guard brigade he participated in forming of second, third and fourth professional brigades of the National Guard. He was also involved in the formation of a mountain brigade, a company for alpine training, orientations, sky and mountain guides. As a Commander of the 1st Brigade he stopped the advance of the Yugoslav People's Army in the direction of Stara Gradiška-Okučani, and the forming of a defense line in front of Novska.

From December 1991 to April 1992, he was the Deputy Chief of Staff of the Croatian Army and he also participated in the process of organizing and training of the Croatian Army. From April to June 1992, he was the Commander of Military District Osijek. After the signing of a ceasefire treaty, he secured conditions for peace in Eastern Slavonia. Conditions for the arrival of UNTAES were also secured under his command. From June to December 1992, he was the Deputy Minister and Chief of the Personnel Department of the Ministry of Defence of Republic of Croatia. From December 1992 to March 1996, Lucić served as the Chief Inspector at the General Inspectorate of the Ministry of Defense. In February 1996, he became the Chief of the Military Academy "Petar Zrinski" in Karlovac.

On 20 November 2000, he became the Deputy Chief of the General Staff of Armed Forces. On 16 January 2003, he was named Chief of the General Staff by commander-in-chief of Armed Forces of Croatia and President of Croatia Stjepan Mesić. On 16 January 2008, his five-year mandate expired and he was formally relieved of his duties. On 28 February 2008, he was named, once again, Chief of General Staff, thereby becoming the first Croatian general to serve in this capacity more than once. On 1 March 2011, he was once again relieved of his duties.

== Decorations ==
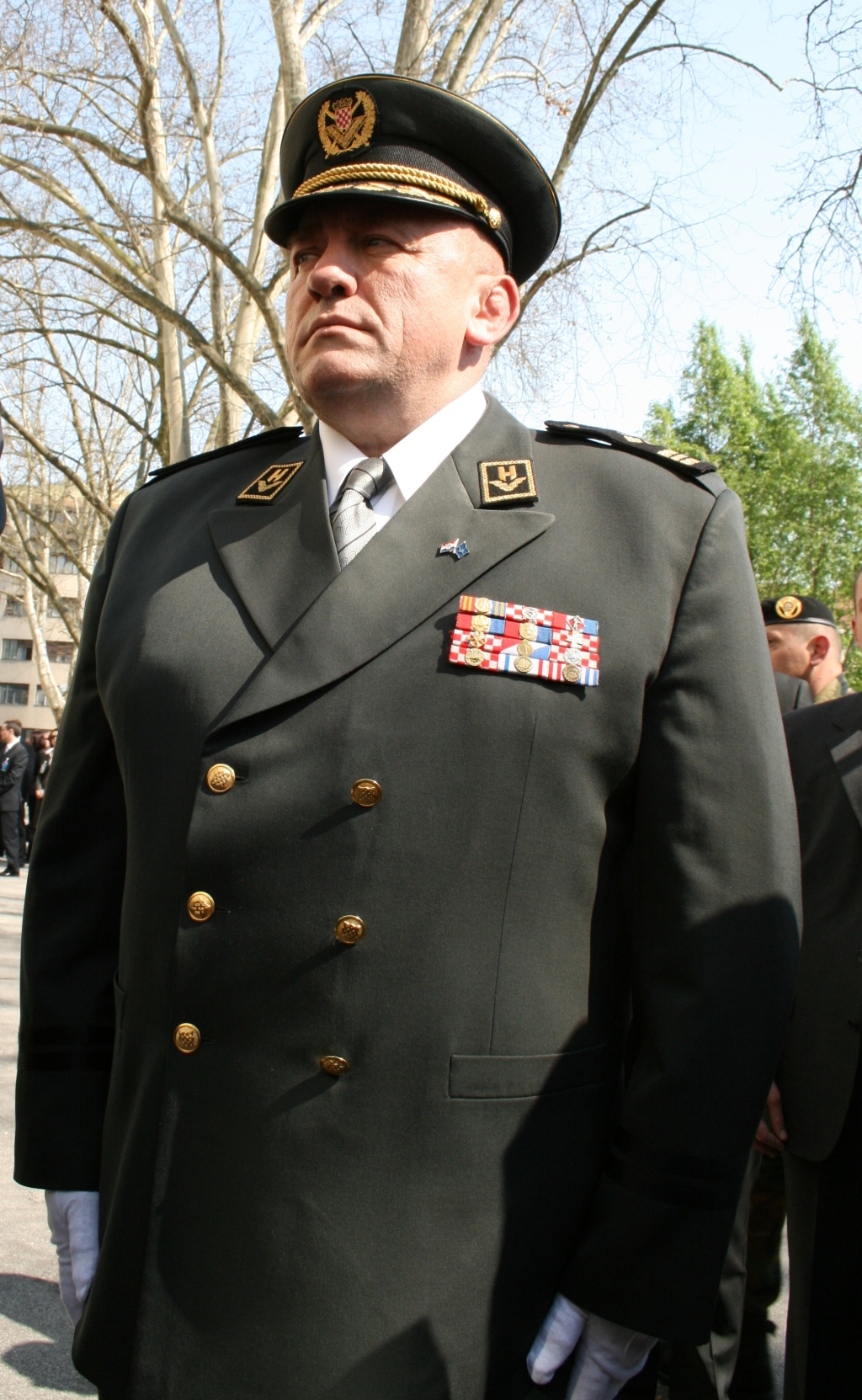
General Josip Lucić during ceremony of raising of NATO flag in Zagreb on 7 April 2009

=== Croatian decorations ===
- Grand Order of King Petar Krešimir IV
- Order of Duke Domagoj
- Order of Nikola Šubić Zrinski
- Order of Ban Jelačić
- Order of Ante Starčević
- Order of the Croatian Trefoil
- Order of the Croatian Interlace
- Commemorative Medal of the Homeland War
- Commemorative Medal of the Homeland's Gratitude for 5 years of honorable service
- Commemorative Medal of the Homeland's Gratitude for 10 years of honorable service
- "Flash" Medal
- "Storm" Medal
- "Exceptional Undertaking" Medal

=== Foreign decorations ===
- Legion of Merit ( (United States) )
- Grand Officer (International Military Sports Council)

== Other offices ==
- Member of Council for Defence and National Security (VONS)
- Member of Military Council
- President of Council for System of Command (SUZA)
- President of High Court-Martial
- President of Croatian delegation for military sports (CISM)
- President of Organization Committee of 2nd Military Games in Zagreb in 1999

== Private life ==
General Lucić is married and has two sons.

Military offices
Preceded by Petar Stipetić	Chief of the General Staff of the Croatian Armed Forces; 16 January 2003 – 16 January 2008	Succeeded by Slavko Barić (acting)
Preceded by Slavko Barić (acting)	Chief of the General Staff of the Croatian Armed Forces; 28 February 2008 – 1 March 2011	Succeeded by Drago Lovrić
