= Mirko Šundov =

Croatian General (born 1962)

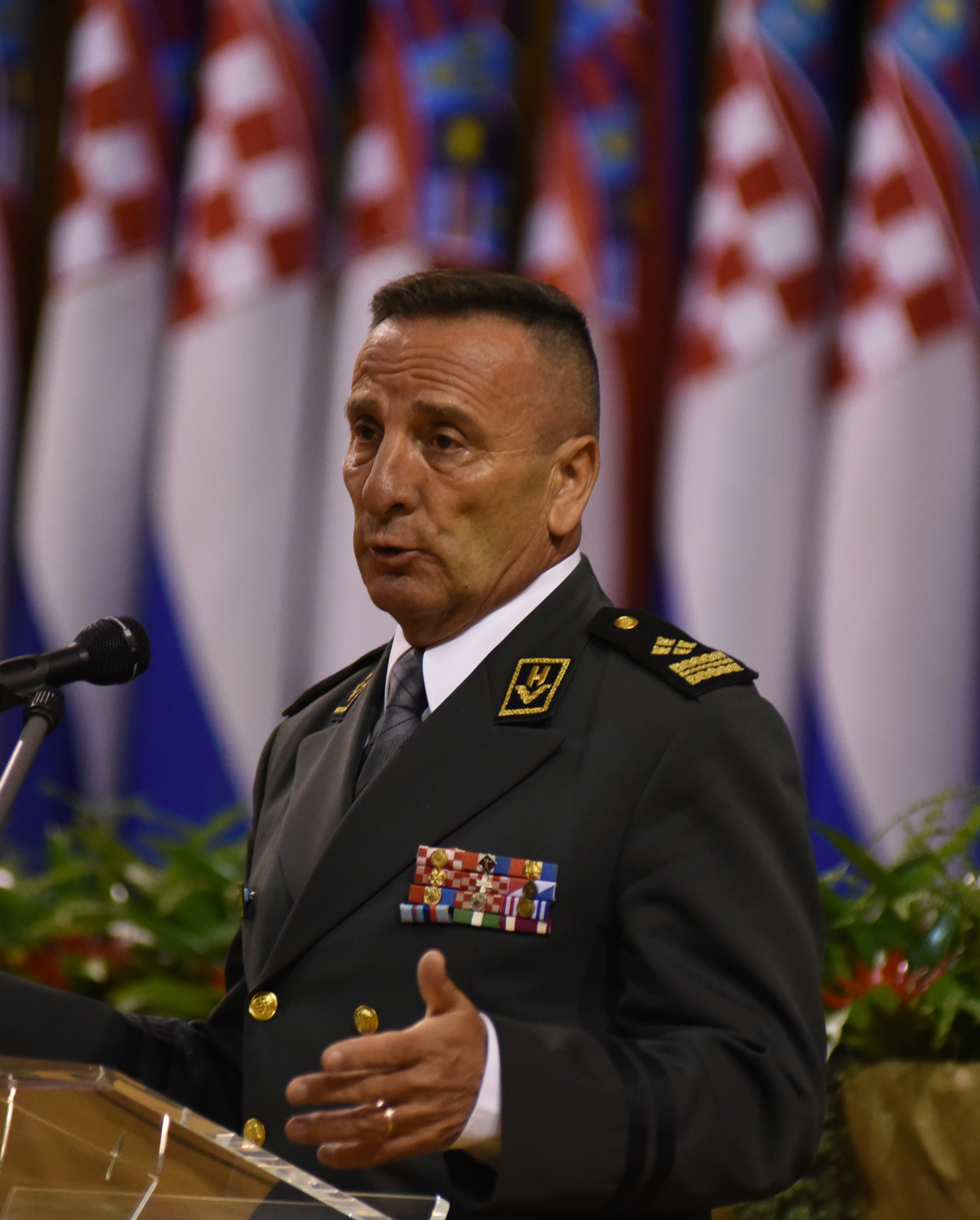
- Born: 15 January 1962 (age 64); Bračević near Split, SR Croatia, SFR Yugoslavia (modern Croatia)
- Military career
- Allegiance: Yugoslavia (1986–1991); Croatia (1991–)
- Branch: Yugoslav Ground Forces; Croatian Army
- Service years: 1986–present
- Rank: General
- Commands: General Staff of the Armed Forces of Croatia
- Conflicts: Croatian War of Independence
- Awards: 12 Croatian decorations, including: Order of Duke Branimir; Order of Nikola Šubić Zrinski; Order of Ban Jelačić; Order of the Croatian Trefoil; Order of the Croatian Interlace (Full list below)

Mirko Šundov (born 15 January 1962) is a Croatian General who served as a Chief of General Staff of the Armed Forces of Croatia from 2016 until 2020.

== Early life and education ==
Mirko Šundov was born on 15 January 1962 in a small village of Bračević in municipality of Muć near Split. He graduated defense in 1986 from the Faculty of Political Science of the University of Sarajevo. He gained his master's degree in 1999 in the field of Geo-sciences, branch Physical Geography, from the Faculty of Science of the University of Zagreb. In 2001, Šundov graduated from the National War College "Ban Josip Jelačić". In 2007, he gained his PhD in the field of Geo-sciences, branch Physical Geography, from the Faculty of Science of the University of Zagreb.

== Career ==
After graduation in 1986, Šundov started working as a Special Adviser in the Croatian Territorial Defense HQs in Split. During the Croatian War of Independence (1991–1995), Šundov at first served as an Assistant Chief of Staff for Operations of the 4th Brigade of the National Guard (1991–1992), and later as its Commander (1992–1995). In 1995, Šundov become Deputy Commander and Chief of Staff of the Area Command Split. After the war, Šundov worked as Director of the Education Directorate CAF GS (1995–1996), Deputy Commander of the Area Command Ston (1996–1998), Commander of the Area Command Knin (1998–2000), Commandant of the Training Command (2001–2003), Commandant of the War College "Ban Josip Jelačić" (2003) in which he also served as a lecturer on module "Military Strategy and Operations, Commandant of the Joint Education and Training Command "Petar Zrinski" (2003–2007), Commandant of the Croatian Defense Academy "Petar Zrinski" (2007–2011), Military Representative of Croatia to NATO and the EU (2011–2014), and Inspector General of Defense of Croatia (2014–2016). In 2016, President Kolinda Grabar-Kitarović and Prime Minister Tihomir Orešković named him Chief of the General Staff of Armed Forces of Croatia.

== Decorations ==
- Order of Duke Branimir with Neck Ribbon
- Order of Nikola Šubić Zrinski
- Order of Ban Jelačić
- Order of the Croatian Trefoil
- Order of the Croatian Interlace
- Commemorative Medal of the Homeland's Gratitude for 5 years of honorable service
- Commemorative Medal of the Homeland's Gratitude for 10 years of honorable service
- Commemorative Medal of the Homeland's Gratitude for 15 years of honorable service
- Homeland War Memorial Medal
- Medal for Participation in Operation Storm
- Pistol, Commander of the 4th Brigade of the National Guard, 1992
- Commendation, President of the Republic of Croatia and Supreme Commander, 1992 and 1993

== Personal life ==
Šundov is married to Marijana Šundov with whom he has two children, son Tomo and daughter Ivana. He speaks Croatian, English and Italian.

Military offices
Preceded by Drago Lovrić	Chief of the General Staff of Armed Forces of Croatia; 1 March 2016 – 28 February 2018	Succeeded by Robert Hranj
