= Imra Agotić =

Croatian general

General Imra Agotić
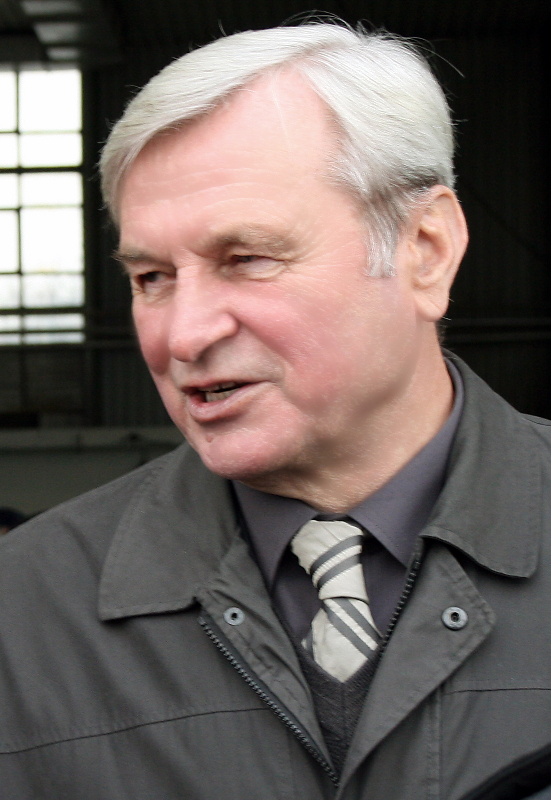
- Born: 12 January 1943; Gorjani, Independent State of Croatia
- Died: 18 March 2012 (aged 69); Zagreb, Croatia
- Burial place: Mirogoj Cemetery
- Military career
- Allegiance: Yugoslav People's Army; Croatian Army
- Branch: SFR Yugoslav Air Force; Croatian Air Force and Air Defence
- Rank: Major General; Lieutenant General; General
- Conflicts: Croatian War of Independence: Operation Flash; Operation Summer '95; Operation Storm
- Awards: Homeland War Memorial Medal; Homeland Gratitude Medal; Order of Nikola Šubić Zrinski; Order of Ban Jelačić; Order of the Croatian Interlace; Operation Flash Medal; Operation Summer '95 Medal; Operation Storm Medal

Imra Agotić (12 January 1943 – 18 March 2012) was a Croatian general who distinguished himself in the Croatian War of Independence.

Agotić was born in Gorjani and was educated in the Yugoslav People's Army. In July 1991, as the war started, he was a member of the 5th Corps Counter-intelligence service, and he defected to the fledgling Croatian National Guard, becoming its first commanding officer in August 1991. In October 1991, President Franjo Tuđman promoted him to the rank of Major General (general bojnik) and made him the chief ceasefire negotiator with the Yugoslav People's Army. Agotić fulfilled that role with success up until the final ceasefire was signed in January 1992, and became known to the public. Agotić then became the first commander of the Croatian Air Force and Defence. He remained in charge of the air force, and was promoted to the rank of Lieutenant General (general pukovnik) in 1995.

Between 1996 and 2000, he was the assistant commander of the General Staff of the Armed Forces of the Republic of Croatia in charge of the air force. In 2000, he was appointed advisor to the President of Croatia for matters of defence and military under Stjepan Mesić. He was promoted to the rank of General (general zbora) and retired from active military service in 2002. Between 2003 and 2005 he held the post of national security advisor to the President. In 2003, he testified against Slobodan Milošević at the ICTY.

Agotić was decorated with the Homeland War Memorial Medal, Homeland Gratitude Medal, Order of Nikola Šubić Zrinski, Order of Ban Jelačić, Order of the Croatian Interlace, as well as medals for Operation Flash, Operation Summer 95 and Operation Storm. In 2006 he became a member of the Military Decorations and Awards Commission with the Office of the President of Croatia that was in charge of awarding military decorations and awards, and in 2010 he was named its chairman. He died in Zagreb.
