= Grand Order of King Petar Krešimir IV =

Grand Order of King Petar Krešimir IV with Sash and Morning Star
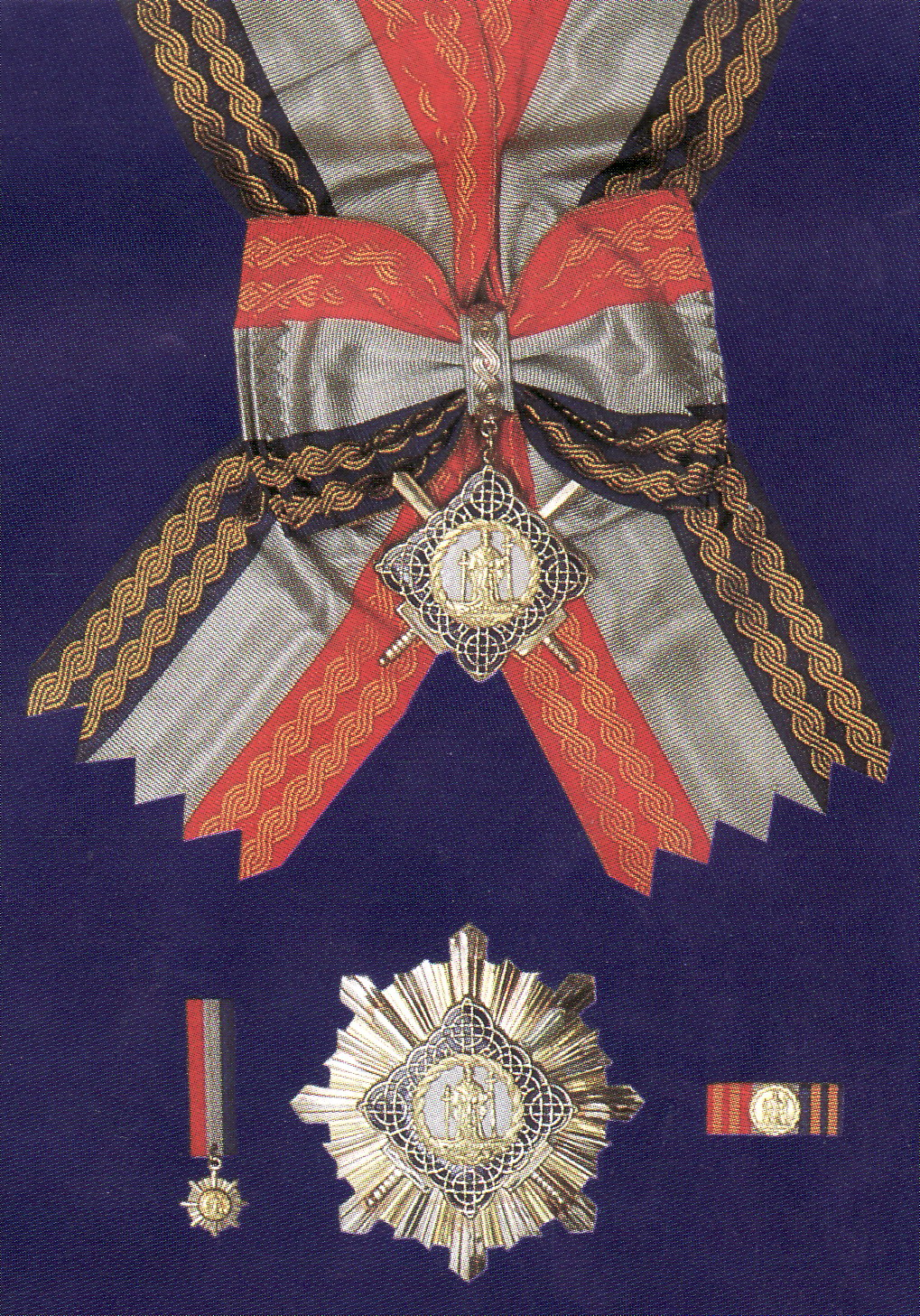
- Grand Order of King Petar Krešimir IV (top: Grand Order medal with sash; bottom: Morning Star (Danica) medal; left: smaller decorative version; right: Grand Order ribbon)
- Awarded for: Contribution to the international reputation and position of Republic of Croatia, outstanding contribution to the independence and integrity of the Republic of Croatia, development and progress of Croatia, and for (his) exceptional contribution to the development of relations between Croatia and the Croatian people with other states and nations, outstanding contribution in the creation of the war strategy and military doctrine, the merit of the building of the Armed Forces and for outstanding achievements in leadership and commanding to units of the Armed Forces
- Country: Republic of Croatia
- Presented by: the President of Croatia
- Eligibility: Dignitaries, high state officials and leaders of international organizations; Croatian and foreign presidents of parliaments and governments; military commanders of Armed Forces of Republic of Croatia
- Status: Currently awarded
- Established: 20 June 1992 (reconstituted 1 April 1995)
- Ribbon of the Grand Order of King Petar Krešimir IV

Precedence
- Next (higher): Grand Order of Queen Jelena
- Next (lower): Grand Order of King Dmitar Zvonimir

The Grand Order of King Petar Krešimir IV (Croatian: Velered kralja Petra Krešimira IV.), or more fully the Grand Order of King Petar Krešimir IV with sash and Morning Star (Velered kralja Petra Krešimira IV. s lentom i Danicom), is an order of the Republic of Croatia. It ranks third in the Croatian order of precedence after the Grand Order of Queen Jelena. The next order in rank is the Grand Order of King Dmitar Zvonimir. The order had been established on 20 June 1992 and reconstituted on 1 April 1995.

Only highly ranked state officials, foreign officials, and senior military officials are eligible for this order.

It is named after King Peter Krešimir IV of Croatia.

== Recipients ==
=== Foreign officials ===
- (United States) Mark Dayton
- (United States) Joseph Dunford
- (Austria) Roland Ertl
- (Netherlands) Jaap de Hoop Scheffer
- (United Kingdom) George Robertson

=== Croatian dignitaries ===
- Janko Bobetko
- Zvonimir Červenko
- Žarko Domljan
- Franjo Gregurić
- Josip Lucić
- Zlatko Mateša
- Nedjeljko Mihanović
- Vlatko Pavletić
- Hrvoje Šarinić
- Vladimir Šeks
- Martin Špegelj
- Petar Stipetić
- Gojko Šušak
- Anton Tus
- Nikica Valentić
- Drago Lovrić
- Pavao Miljavac
- Davor Domazet-Lošo
- Mladen Markač
- Ante Gotovina
- Ivan Čermak
- Drago Matanović
- Mirko Šundov
- Miljenko Crnjac
- Đuro Dečak
- Marijan Mareković
- Rahim Ademi
- Luka Džanko
- Nojko Marinović
- Damir Krstičević
- Vinko Vrbanac
- Ante Kotromanović
- Ivan Kapular
- Mladen Kruljac
- Jozo Milićević
- Zvonko Peternel
- Robert Hranj
- Ivan Jarnjak
