= Drago Lovrić =

Croatian general (born 1961)

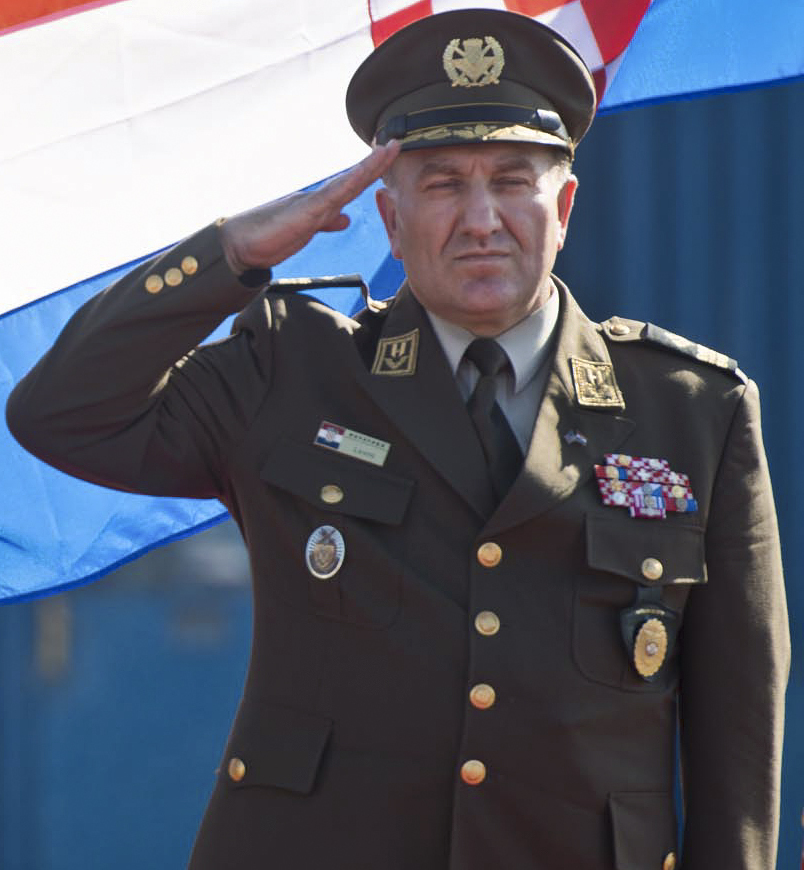
- Born: 2 December 1961 (age 64); Vukšić Gornji, Brčko, PR Bosnia and Herzegovina, FPR Yugoslavia
- Military career
- Allegiance: Yugoslavia (1983–1991); Croatia
- Service years: 1983–present
- Rank: General
- Commands: General Staff of the Armed Forces of the Republic of Croatia
- Conflicts: Croatian War of Independence
- Awards: Order of Duke Domagoj

Drago Lovrić (born 2 December 1961) is a Croatian general who served as a chief of General Staff of the Armed Forces of the Republic of Croatia.

== Biography ==
General Drago Lovrić holds Master of Science degrees in international relations from Zagreb University and National Resource Strategy, from the Industrial College of Armed Forces of the U.S. National Defense University in Washington, which he attended from May 2003 to November 2004. In July 2012, he earned his doctorate in the field of national security.

Having graduated from the Army Academy as a second lieutenant, he was promoted to first lieutenant in 1984 and to captain in 1987. After joining the Croatian Armed Forces, he was promoted to major in 1992, to lieutenant colonel in 1993 and to colonel in 1995. In 1996, he was promoted to the rank of staff brigadier and brigadier general in 2000. In 2005, he was promoted to major general; in 2011 he was promoted to lieutenant general, and in 2014, he was promoted to general.

He has been decorated with the following Croatian military decorations: Homeland War Commemorative Decoration, Homeland War Commemorative Decoration for 5 and 10 years of distinguished service, Order of the Croatian Braid, Order of the Croatian Trefoil, Order of the Croatian Cross, Order of Ban Josip Jelačić, and Order of Duke Domagoj with Neck Ribbon. He has also received a Medal for Participation in Operation “Storm” and a Medal for Daring Feat.

== Private life ==
He is married and has two children.

== Decorations ==
- Order of Duke Domagoj
- Order of Ban Jelačić
- Order of the Croatian Cross
- Order of the Croatian Trefoil
- Order of the Croatian Interlace
- Commemorative Medal of the Homeland's Gratitude for 5 years of honorable service
- Commemorative Medal of the Homeland's Gratitude for 10 years of honorable service
- Medal for Participation in Operation Storm
- Medal for Exceptional Undertakings

== Sources ==
Military offices
Preceded by Josip Lucić	Chief of the General Staff of Armed Forces of Croatia; 1 March 2011 - 1 March 2016	Succeeded by Mirko Šundov
