= Predrag Matić =

Croatian politician (1962–2024)

Predrag Fred Matić
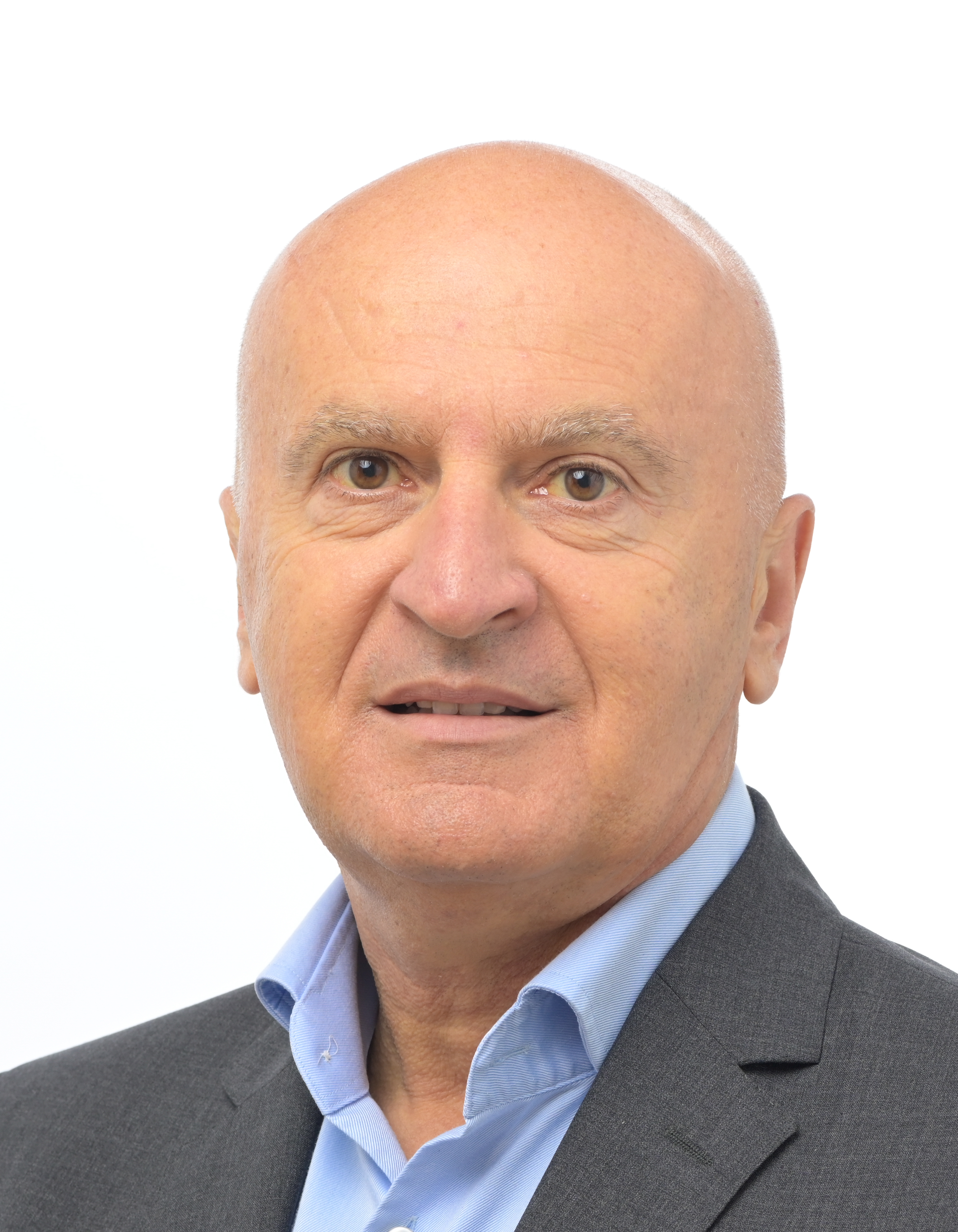

Member of the European Parliament for Croatia
- In office 2 July 2019 – 23 August 2024

Member of the Croatian Parliament for the 5th electoral district
- In office 28 December 2015 – 2 July 2019

Chairman of SEECP
- In office 2016–2017

Minister of Veterans' Affairs
- In office 23 December 2011 – 22 January 2016
- Prime Minister: Zoran Milanović
- Preceded by: Tomislav Ivić
- Succeeded by: Mijo Crnoja

Advisor to the President of Croatia
- In office 19 February 2010 – 23 December 2011
- President: Ivo Josipović

Personal details
- Born: 2 June 1962 Slavonska Požega, PR Croatia, FPR Yugoslavia (modern Croatia)
- Died: 23 August 2024 (aged 62) Zagreb, Croatia
- Party: Croatian; Social Democratic Party; EU; S&D
- Spouse: Svetlana Patković (m. 1999)
- Children: 1
- Education: University of Osijek
- Awards: Order of Duke Domagoj; Order of Nikola Šubić Zrinski; Order of the Croatian Cross; Order of the Croatian Trefoil; Order of the Croatian Interlace; Homeland's Gratitude Medal; Homeland War Memorial Medal

Military service
- Allegiance: Croatia
- Branch/service: Croatian Army
- Years of service: 1991 - 1998
- Rank: Brigadier
- Battles/wars: Croatian War of Independence: Battle of Vukovar; Operation Flash; Operation Storm

Predrag Fred Matić (2 June 1962 – 23 August 2024) was a Croatian centre-left politician of the Social Democratic Party who served as a Member of European Parliament from 2019 to his death. He previously served as Minister of Veterans' Affairs from 2011 to 2016, in the Cabinet of Zoran Milanović.

== Early life ==
Matić was born in Požega, Croatia on 2 June 1962. He attended University of Osijek from which he graduated with a B.A. in education.

== Military career ==
During the summer of 1991, Matić served in Croatian Armed Forces as one of the defenders of Trpinjska Street in Vukovar, during the Battle of Vukovar. He was captured in November 1991 and throughout nine months was exposed to almost daily torture in Serbian concentration camps, including in the Stajićevo camp. In summer 1992 he was released, and for his bravery and heroism was awarded with numerous medals and military decorations, followed by a discharge with a rank of brigadier of Croatian Army.

== Political career ==
=== Career in national politics ===
After the war, Matić worked in the Cabinet of the Chief of the General Staff of the Armed Forces of the Republic of Croatia and held the post of Chief and Spokesman of General Affairs at its Office from 1994 to 1998. From 1998 to 2000, he was the head of the Ministry of Croatian Veterans and from 2004 to 2005 served as an advisor to Deputy Prime Minister Jadranka Kosor.

From 2008 to 2009, Matić served as a member of Croatian Parliament and until 2010 served as a member of the management board of Croatian Transparency. From 2010 to 2011 he served as Special Advisor to the President of Croatia Ivo Josipović. Following it, he assumed the role of Minister of Veterans' Affairs on which he remained until 2016, and same year served as a member of the SDP General Board.

On 28 December 2015, Matić was elected as an MP and represented Social Democratic Party of Croatia from the 5th constituency. On that same day, his candidacy was suspended, and Biljana Gaća was elected instead. He ran again, this time during the 2016 campaign, assuming office until 14 October, but was dropped in January of that year. After his candidacy was dropped, he served as a member of Defence Committee, Gender Equality Committee and the National Security Council.

In addition to his committee assignments, Matić held the post of a Deputy Member of the Croatian delegation to the Parliamentary Assembly of the South-East European Cooperation Process and was also a member of the Interparliamentary Co-operation Committee.

On 14 October 2016, Matić was elected back into an MP, using "Predrag" as his personal name. On 1 March 2019, he changed his name to "Predrag Fred" Matić following his reelection. During those years, from November 2016, he was a head of the Delegation to the Parliamentary Assembly of the South-East European Cooperation Process and was a member of the Interparliamentary Co-operation Committee.

=== Member of the European Parliament, 2019–2024 ===
Matić was a Member of the European Parliament from the 2019 elections. In parliament, he served on the Committee on Fisheries and on the Committee on Culture and Education. He was an alternate member of the Committee on Women's Rights and Gender Equality, where he served as the parliament's rapporteur on sexual and reproductive health and rights in the EU.

In addition to his committee assignments, Matić was part of the Parliament's delegation for relations with the Arab Peninsula.

In September 2022, Matić was the recipient of the Justice, Rule of Law and Human Rights Award at The Parliament Magazine's annual MEP Awards.

== Political positions ==
In 2018, Matić commented on Aleksandar Vučić's statement that Croatia wanted a country without Serbs, comparing it to Adolf Hitler's comments on how he wanted Germany without Jews.

== Death ==
Matić died on 23 August 2024, at the age of 62.
