= Petar Stipetić =

Croatian general (1937–2018)

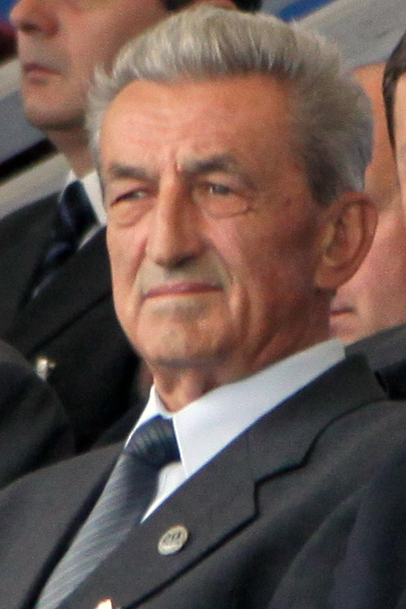
- Petar Stipetić on the anniversary of the Croatian Armed Forces on 28 May 2011
- Born: 24 October 1937; Ogulin, Kingdom of Yugoslavia (modern Croatia)
- Died: 14 March 2018 (aged 80); Zagreb, Croatia
- Military career
- Allegiance: Yugoslavia (1956–1991) Croatia (1991–2003)
- Branch: Yugoslav People's Army (1956–1991) Croatian Army (1991–2003)
- Service years: 1956–2003
- Rank: Major General (JNA); General of the Army (HV)
- Commands: Croatian Armed Forces
- Conflicts: Croatian War of Independence: Operation Medak Pocket; Operation Flash; Operation Storm; Bosnian War: Operation Corridor 92
- Awards: Order of Nikola Šubić Zrinski Order of Ban Jelačić

Petar Stipetić (24 October 1937 – 14 March 2018) was a Croatian general who served as the Chief of the General Staff of the Armed Forces of Croatia from 2000 until 2002.

== Education and service in Yugoslav People's Army ==
Stipetić was born in Ogulin. In Ogulin, Stipetić attended elementary school and high school. After that, Stipetić entered Army Military Academy in 1956 and graduated in 1959. He said that during his youth he had no intention of joining the army, but the Military Academy was the only one he could afford at the time. After his first year, he considered dropping out of the academy, but changed his mind eventually. In 1967 he entered High Army Military Academy, graduating in 1969, after which he entered War Academy in 1975 and graduated a year later with excellent grades. In 1979, he was teaching tactics on Territorial Defense courses in Karlovac. He obtained the rank of general in 1989, with theoretical thesis "The Defence of Large Cities" and practical thesis "Organisation of a Corps with Reduced Numerical Strength".

== Croatian War of Independence ==
After start of clashes in Croatia, in September 1991 president Franjo Tuđman invited Stipetić to cross over to Croatian side. Stipetić agreed, but asked the president for a secrecy for a few days, until he solves some matters in Yugoslav People's Army. Tuđman agreed, but contrary to that, on that same day gave a statement to Croatian media about Stipetić's cross-over, which put Stipetić at a very awkward position at a time. He was appointed a deputy to Anton Tus, at the time Chief of General Staff and became in charge of establishing a frontline from Eastern Slavonia towards Dubrovnik, across the length of entire country. He was also a negotiator with rebelled Serbs and soon become commander of the Osijek Military District and Slavonian Front. In December 1992, Stipetić was named commander of the Zagreb Military District and in September 1994 he was transferred to the General Staff as an assistant to the Chief of General Staff for the combat sector. Stipetić participated in liberation of western Slavonia and was one of the commanders of the Operation Storm executed in 1995. During the Operation Storm, Stipetić was initially assigned commander of Croatian forces in eastern Slavonia, where Serbian counter-attack was expected. However, after the failure of Croatian Army offensive in region Banija, he was ordered by president Tuđman to take over command on that line of attack and improve the situation. Upon his arrival, Stipetić modified attack plans and ordered forces under his command to bypass enemy strongpoints which resulted with CA achieving a breakthrough, while 21st Kordun Corps of ARSK subsequently surrendered. Upon surrendering, commander of 21st Kordun Corps, Čedomir Bulat, Stipetić''s former comrade from Yugoslav People's Army greeted him:

Sir, the commander of 21st Kordun Corps - colonel Čedomir Bulat, surrenders the corps to You and I congratulate the Croatian Army on its victory!

After the surrender was formalised, Stipetić unsuccessfully attempted to urge fleeing Serb civilians to remain in their homes and allowed all officers of the defeated army to keep their sidearms.

== Post war ==
After the war, on 10 March 2000, he was named Chief of General Staff and served until 30 December 2002, when he was retired. In January 2018, Stipetić suffered a stroke and died two months later in Zagreb.

== Legacy ==
Stipetić is appreciated by many Croatians who describe him as: "a general who led Croatian Army to great victory", "rational, emphatic, composed and expert general with a cigarette", or "an officer and a gentleman". However, his contributions in defense of Croatia are often attacked by people close to Croatian Democratic Union who dislike him for refusing to join their political party during the Šušak era.

== Decorations and honors ==
On 14 September 1998, Stipetić was named honorary citizen of Ogulin and Vis. He was also decorated with several decorations:

Ribbon	Decoration
	Order of Nikola Šubić Zrinski
	Order of Ban Jelačić
	Commemorative Medal of the Homeland War
	Order of the Croatian Trefoil
	Order of the Croatian Wattle
	Commemorative Medal of the Homeland's Gratitude
