= Ante Kotromanović =

Croatian politician and army officer

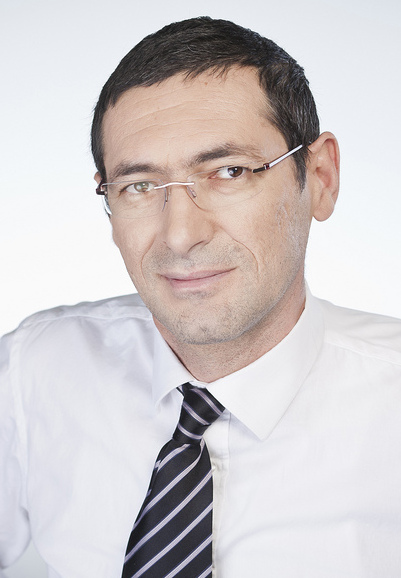

Minister of Defence
- In office 23 December 2011 – 22 January 2016
- Prime Minister: Zoran Milanović
- Preceded by: Davor Božinović
- Succeeded by: Josip Buljević

Member of the Croatian Parliament
- In office 11 January 2008 – 22 December 2011
- Prime Minister: Ivo Sanader (until 2009) Jadranka Kosor
- Constituency: IX electoral district

Personal details
- Born: 8 May 1968 (age 58) Hrvace, SR Croatia, SFR Yugoslavia
- Party: Social Democratic Party
- Education: War College "Ban Josip Jelačić"
- Occupation: Politician
- Profession: Soldier
- Awards: Order of Duke Domagoj Order of Nikola Šubić Zrinski Order of Ban Jelačić

Military service
- Allegiance: Croatia
- Branch/service: Croatian Army
- Years of service: 1990–2002
- Rank: Brigadier
- Commands: 126 Sinj Brigade 4th Guards Brigade
- Battles/wars: Croatian War of Independence: Operation Summer '95; Operation Storm; Operation Mistral 2

Ante Kotromanović (pronounced [ǎːnte kotromǎːnoʋitɕ]; born 8 May 1968) is a Croatian politician and army officer who served as the Minister of Defence of Croatia from December 2011 until January 2016.

== Biography ==
Kotromanović was born in Potravlje near Hrvace. He graduated from the Command and Staff Academy "Blago Zadro" and War College "Ban Josip Jelačić".

In 1990, he became a member of the special forces of the Croatian police. A year later, in 1991, he became commander of a special forces company, in the headquarters of the Croatian Army. In 1992, he was named the commander of a battalion in a teaching center in Sinj. From 1993 to 1996, he was the commander of the 126th Sinj Brigade and Sinj Operational Zone. From 1996 to 19 October 1999, he also commanded the 4th Guards Brigade. After that, he attended the War College "Ban Josip Jelačić", and in 2001, was named commander of the Dubrovnik Divisional District. He retired from army service in 2002.

From 11 January 2008 to 22 December 2011, he was a member of the Croatian Parliament, after which he became Minister of Defence under Zoran Milanović.

== Decorations ==
Ribbon	Decoration
	Order of Duke Domagoj
	Order of Nikola Šubić Zrinski
	Order of Ban Jelačić
	Medal for Exceptional Undertakings
	Commemorative Medal of the Homeland War
	Commemorative Medal of the Homeland's Gratitude
	Medal for Participation in Operation "Summer '95"
	Medal for Participation in Operation "Storm"
	Cross Medal of the Special Forces
