= Luka Misetic =

Croatian American lawyer (born 1970)

Luka Misetic (spelled in Croatian as Mišetić, born 1970) is an American lawyer who specializes in criminal law.

Misetic is prominent for defending the Croatian general Ante Gotovina at the International Criminal Tribunal for former Yugoslavia and the former president of Kosovo Hashim Thaçi at the Kosovo Specialist Chambers.

In 2006, Misetic was named one of the 100 most influential Croatians in the world by Globus magazine.

== Early life ==
Misetic was born and raised in Chicago. His parents were Croat immigrants from western Herzegovina near Ljubuški (now part of Bosnia and Herzegovina). Misetic visited Croatia for the first time when he was 16, in 1986. He learned Croatian from his family. At the beginning of the Croatian War of Independence Misetic sent financial aid to Croatia. In 1992 Misetic graduated political science at the Northwestern University with departmental honors. After that he entered the Notre Dame Law School graduating in 1996, where he received the Dean's Award for excellence in the study of International Law.

== Career ==
In 1996 Misetic gained membership in the Illinois State Bar and the US District Court Northern District of Illinois; a year later, in 1997 he became a member of the International Criminal Tribunal for former Yugoslavia in The Hague in Netherlands. Misetic is also a member of the Chicago Bar Association, the Association of Defence Counsel before the ICTY and the Illinois State Bar Association. In 1999 he was elected among the 12 most promising lawyers in Chicago.

Misetic received international attention while defending a Bosnian Croat Anto Furundžija in 1999. He was the youngest attorney ever to defend a case in front of an international criminal tribunal. While preparing Furundžija's defense in Zagreb's hotel Sheraton he met Ante Gotovina. In October 2001 he became his attorney, accomplishing Gotovina's release in November 2012.

Mr. Misetic has appeared before the International Court of Justice in The Hague. He also represents clients in international arbitration cases before the Permanent Court of Arbitration in The Hague, as well as the International Centre for Settlement of Investment Disputes.
