= Anton Tus =

Croatian general (1931–2023)

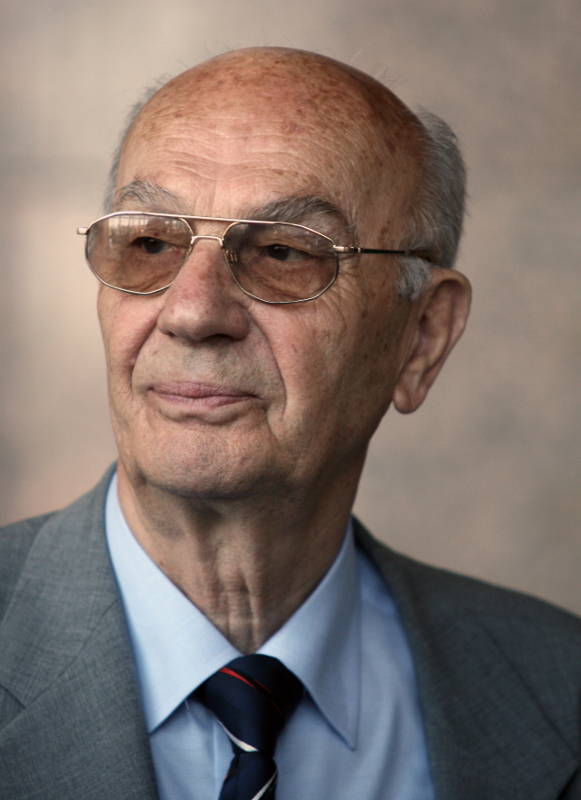
- Tus in 2009
- Born: 22 November 1931; Bribir, Kingdom of Yugoslavia (modern Croatia)
- Died: 4 September 2023 (aged 91) Zagreb, Croatia
- Allegiance: SFR Yugoslavia (1947–1991); Croatia (1991–1992)
- Branch: Yugoslav Air Force; Croatian Armed Forces
- Service years: 1949–1992 (commissioned as an officer and pilot in 1953, joined the Air Force Academy in 1949)
- Rank: Colonel General (JNA); General of the Army (HV)
- Commands: 204th Fighter Regiment (1968–1969); 5th Aviation Corps; Yugoslav Air Force (1985–1991); Croatian Armed Forces General Staff (Glavni stožer OSRH, 1991–1992)
- Conflicts: Croatian War of Independence
- Awards: Grand Order of King Petar Krešimir IV; Order of Duke Domagoj; Order of Nikola Šubić Zrinski; Order of the Croatian Trefoil

Anton Tus (Croatian pronunciation: [aŋton tus]; 22 November 1931 – 4 September 2023) was a Croatian general who served as head of the Yugoslav Air Force between 1985 and 1991 and was the first Chief of Staff of the Croatian Armed Forces from 1991 to 1992 during the Croatian War of Independence.

== Biography ==
A graduate of the Yugoslav Air Force Academy, Tus spent most of his career serving in the Yugoslav Air Force. From 1968 to 1969 he was commander of the 204th Fighter Aviation Regiment stationed at Batajnica Air Base. After that he was commander of the 5th Air Force and Air Defence Corps based in SR Croatia.

In 1985 he was promoted to the head of the Yugoslav Air Force and held that post until his defection in May 1991 amid the breakup of Yugoslavia. From September 1991 he was the first Chief of the General Staff of the Croatian Armed Forces, until November 1992, when he opposed Minister of Defence Gojko Šušak's policy towards Bosnia and Herzegovina. He was succeeded in that post by general Janko Bobetko.

Between 1992 and 1995 he was President Franjo Tuđman's chief military advisor, before becoming head of Defence Ministry's Office for International Cooperation between 1995 and 2001. In 2001 he was appointed to the post of the chief of the Croatian Mission to NATO until retirement in 2005.

Tus died in Zagreb on 4 September 2023, at the age of 91.

== Honors ==
- Grand Order of King Petar Krešimir IV
- Order of Duke Domagoj
- Order of Nikola Šubić Zrinski
- Order of the Croatian Trefoil
