= Charter of the Republic of Croatia =

State award by the President of Croatia

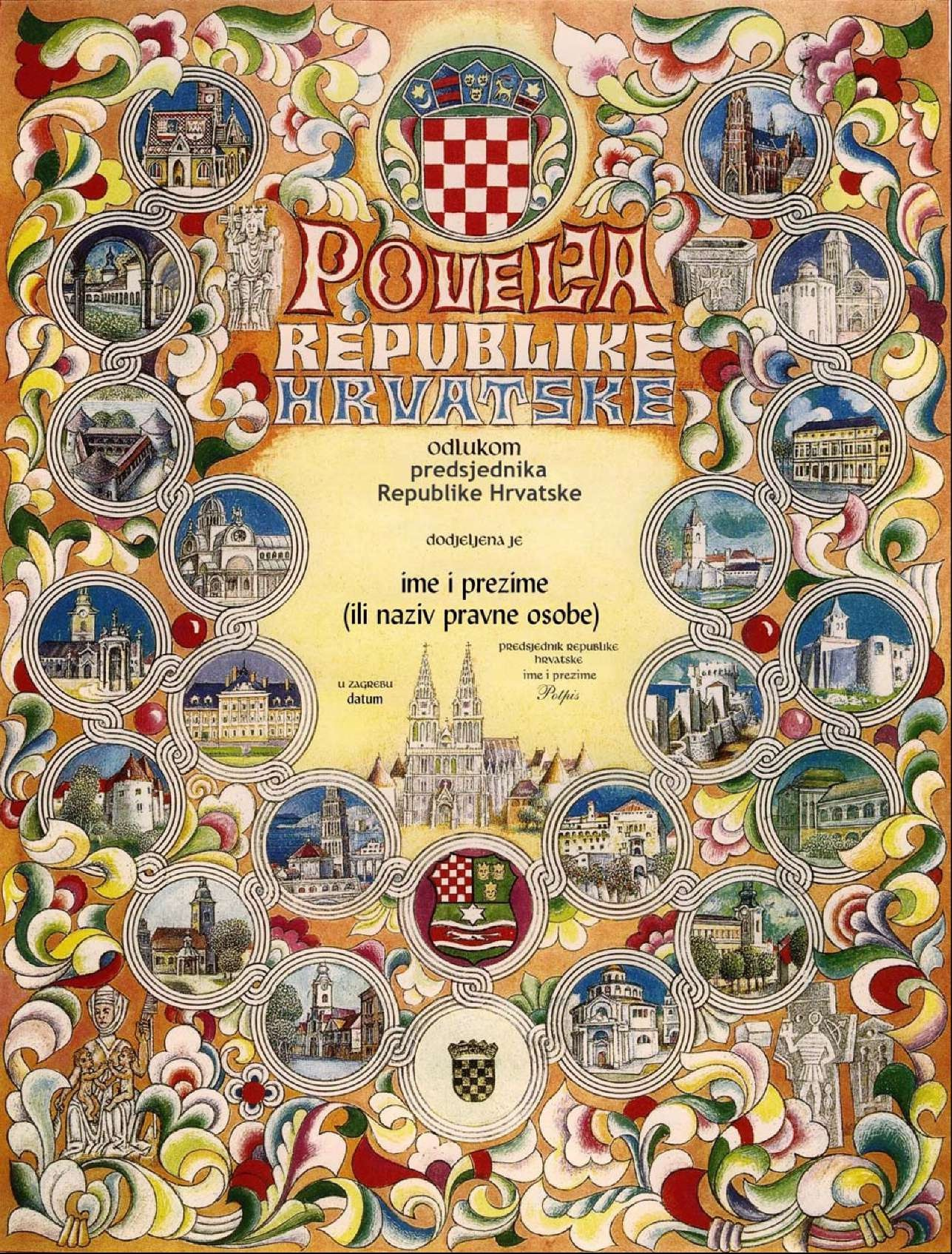
Charter

Charter of the Republic of Croatia (Croatian: Povelja Republike Hrvatske) is Croatian state decoration conferred by the President of the Republic of Croatia. It is awarded to international organizations, legal entities, foreign statesmen and Croatian and foreign citizens for their contribution to the development and promotion of the international position of the Republic of Croatia and for their contribution to the scientific, cultural, economic and other development of the Republic of Croatia. Croatian president awards it on his own initiative or on the proposal of the State Commission for Awards and Recognitions of the Republic of Croatia.

== Charter ==
The charter consists of a written document, which is printed on graph paper (300 g/m^{2}, size 297 x 420 mm). The document is bounded by a rectangle centered in relation to the paper. Inside the rectangle is a brown-yellow background richly decorated with multi-colored vegetal patterns that occupy the space inside the edges of the rectangle. Between the vegetal relief in bounded circles there are drawings of buildings characteristic for each of the counties of Croatia. Centered on the upper part of the document in a bounded circle on a green background is the coat of arms of the Republic of Croatia with vegetal engravings on the sides. Below the coat of arms, in stylized letters in the colors of the flag of the Republic of Croatia, is the text: CHARTER/REPUBLIC/CROATIA (the "/" sign indicates the transition to a new line). Centered at the bottom of the document in a bounded circle on a white background, the coat of arms of the Republic of Croatia is printed in gold. The content of the document is printed on a yellow background under the inscription CHARTER/REPUBLIC/CROATIA and reads:

"BY THE DECISION OF/THE PRESIDENT/OF THE REPUBLIC OF CROATIA/was assigned/NAME AND SURNAME (OR NAME OF LEGAL ENTITY)." Below the first and last name (or the name of the legal entity), and to the left of the drawing of the Zagreb cathedral, is written: In Zagreb/date. Below the name and surname (or the name of the legal entity), and to the right of the drawing of the Zagreb cathedral, is written: PRESIDENT OF THE REPUBLIC/CROATIA/name and surname of the President of the Republic/signature of the President of the Republic.
