= Frane Vinko Golem =

Croatian politician and physician (1938–2007)

Minister of Foreign Affairs
- In office 8 November 1990 – 3 May 1991
- Prime Minister: Josip Manolić
- Preceded by: Zdravko Mršić
- Succeeded by: Davorin Rudolf

Member of the Croatian Parliament
- In office 1990–1992
- Prime Minister: Stjepan Mesić; Josip Manolić; Franjo Gregurić

Personal details
- Born: 4 October 1938 Bisko (part of Trilj), Kingdom of Yugoslavia
- Died: 11 August 2007 (aged 68) Zagreb, Croatia
- Party: Croatian Democratic Union
- Education: University of Zagreb

Frane Vinko Golem (4 October 1938 – 11 August 2007) was a Croatian diplomat and politician.

Golem, a physician by profession, was the Croatian Minister of Foreign Affairs from November 1990 to May 1991. In 1992 he founded the Department for Endocrine Surgery at the KBC Šalata in Zagreb.

== Honours ==
- Order of Danica Hrvatska with the image of Katarina Zrinska
- Order of the Croatian Trefoil
- Homeland War Memorial Medal
- Homeland's Gratitude Medal
