= Grand Order of Queen Jelena =

Grand Order of Queen Jelena with Sash and Morning Star
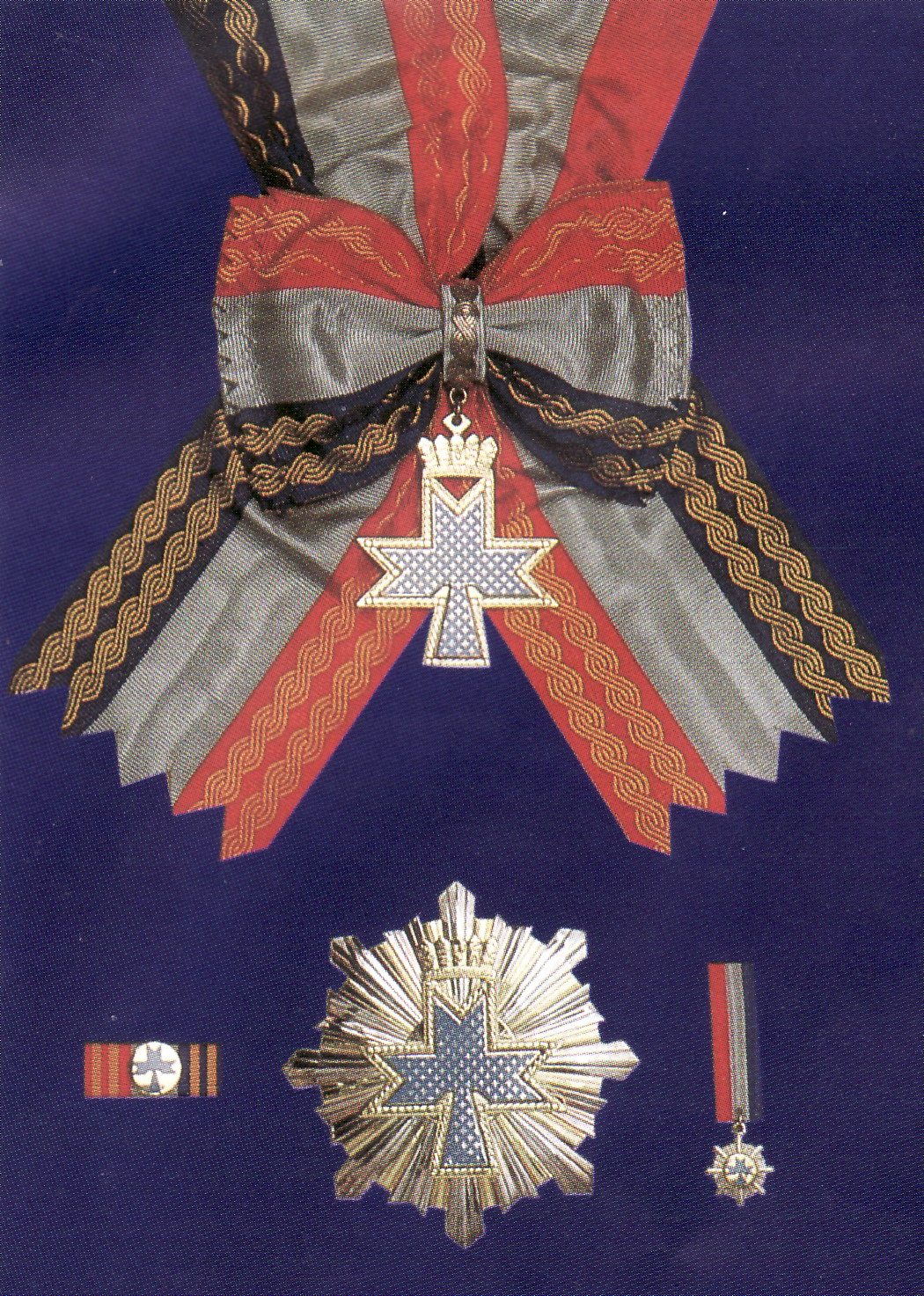
- Grand Order of Queen Jelena (top: Grand Order medal with sash; bottom: Morning Star (Danica) medal; left: smaller decorative version; right: Grand Order ribbon)
- Awarded for: Contributions to the international reputation and status of the Republic of Croatia, for exceptional contributions to the independence and integrity of the Republic of Croatia, the development and construction of the Republic of Croatia, and for their personal exceptional contributions to the development of relationships between Croatia and the Croatian people and other countries and peoples; for exceptional contributions in the formulation of military strategy and doctrine, for merit in developing the Croatian armed forces, and for particular accomplishment in the leadership and command of the Croatian armed forces
- Country: Republic of Croatia
- Presented by: the President of Croatia
- Eligibility: Highly ranked state officials, foreign officials, senior military officials
- Status: Currently awarded
- Established: 1 April 1995
- Ribbon of the Grand Order of Queen Jelena

Precedence
- Next (higher): Grand Order of King Tomislav
- Next (lower): Grand Order of King Petar Krešimir IV

The Grand Order of Queen Jelena (Croatian: Velered kraljice Jelene), or more fully the Grand Order of Queen Jelena with Sash and Morning Star (Velered kraljice Jelene s lentom i Danicom), is an order of the Republic of Croatia. It was established in 1995. It ranks second in the Croatian order of precedence after the Grand Order of King Tomislav.

The order, along with the Grand Order of King Petar Krešimir IV, is awarded to dignitaries, other state officials and heads of international organizations for their contributions to the international reputation and status of the Republic of Croatia; to Croatian and foreign statesmen and parliamentary and government leaders for exceptional contributions to the independence and integrity of the Republic of Croatia, the development and construction of the Republic of Croatia, and for their personal exceptional contributions to the development of relationships between Croatia and the Croatian people and other countries and peoples; and to senior armed forces officers for exceptional contributions in the formulation of military strategy and doctrine, for merit in developing the Croatian armed forces, and for particular accomplishment in the leadership and command of the Croatian armed forces.

It is named after Queen Helen I of Croatia.

== Description ==
The badge of the order is a blue trefoil edged in gold. The trefoil is topped by a crown in the form of the upper part of the Croatian coat of arms (five shields representing the five geographical regions that comprise Croatia) with the words "KRALJICE JELENE" at the base. The badge is suspended from a sash of equal stripes of blue, white and red, with an interwoven wattle pattern on the red and blue stripes.

The star of the order has the badge above on a star with eight longer and eight shorter silver rays, with gold rays between.

== Recipients ==
=== Foreign officials ===
- 2017 - (Qatar) Mozah bint Nasser Al Missned (as Her Highness Sheikha Mozah bint Nasser)
- 2015 - Al Gore (as former Vice President of the United States)
- 2013 - Queen Silvia of Sweden (as Queen of Sweden)
- 2013 - Anna Komorowska (as First Lady of Poland)
- 2011 - Jacques Rogge (as President of the International Olympic Committee)
- 2011 - Queen Sonja of Norway (as Queen of Norway)
- 2008 - Yasuo Fukuda (as Prime Minister of Japan)
- 2007 - Mikuláš Dzurinda (as former Prime Minister of Slovakia)
- 2007 - Wolfgang Schüssel (as former Chancellor of Austria)
- 2006 - Gerhard Schröder (as former Chancellor of Germany)
- 2006 - Helmut Kohl (as former Chancellor of Germany)
- 2006 - (Spain) Josep Borrell Fontelles (as President of the European Parliament)
- 2006 - Wilfried Martens (as former Prime Minister of Belgium)
- 2006 - (Germany) Hans-Gert Pöttering (as President of the European People's Party)
- 2003 - Prince Henrik of Denmark (as Consort of the Danish monarch)
- 2002 - József Antall (as former Prime Minister of Hungary) - awarded posthumously
- 2000 - Madeleine Albright (as United States Secretary of State)
- 1995 - (India) Mother Teresa of Calcutta
- 1995 - Alija Izetbegović (as President of the Presidency of Bosnia and Herzegovina)
- 1995 - Krešimir Zubak (as President of the Federation of Bosnia and Herzegovina)

=== Croatian dignitaries ===
- 2021 - Jadranka Kosor (as former Prime Minister of Croatia)
- 2012 - Boris Šprem (as former Speaker of the Croatian Parliament) - awarded posthumously
- 2011 - Martin Špegelj (as former General of Croatian Army)
- 2008 - Luka Bebić (as Speaker of the Croatian Parliament)
- 2008 - Ivo Sanader (as Prime Minister of Croatia) - revoked
- 2008 - Josip Manolić (as former Prime Minister of Croatia)
- 2008 - Ivica Račan (as former Prime Minister of Croatia) - awarded posthumously
