= Order of the Croatian Cross =

Order of the Croatian Cross Red hrvatskog križa
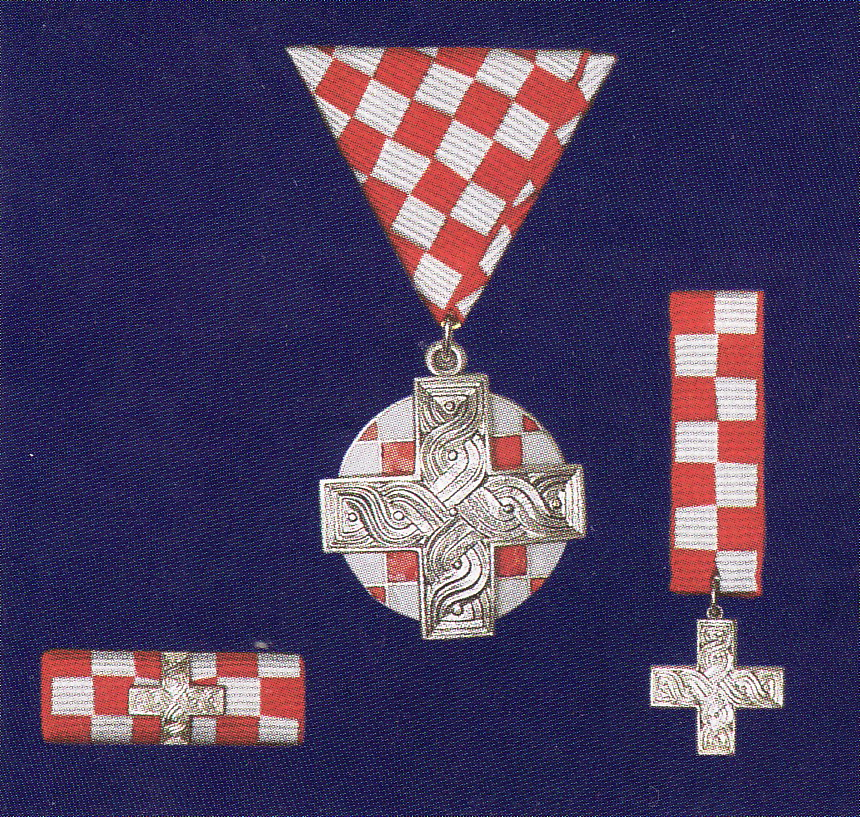
- Type: Military medal
- Awarded for: Being severely wounded while participating in the Croatian War of Independence
- Country: Republic of Croatia
- Presented by: the President of Croatia
- Eligibility: Croatian and foreign citizens
- Status: Active
- Established: 1 April 1995
- Ribbon of the Order of the Croatian Cross

Precedence
- Next (higher): Order of Danica Hrvatska
- Next (lower): Order of the Croatian Trefoil

Order of the Croatian Cross (Croatian: Red hrvatskog križa) is the 15th important medal given by Republic of Croatia. The order was founded on 1 April 1995.

== Overview ==
The Order of the Croatian Cross is awarded to Croatian and foreign nationals who were severely wounded while participating in the Croatian War of Independence.

The medal is awarded by the President of Croatia or his deputy.

== Notable recipients ==
- Drago Lovrić
- Predrag Matić
- Mirko Šundov
- Bekim Berisha
