= Grand Order of King Tomislav =

Grand Order of King Tomislav with Sash and Great Morning Star
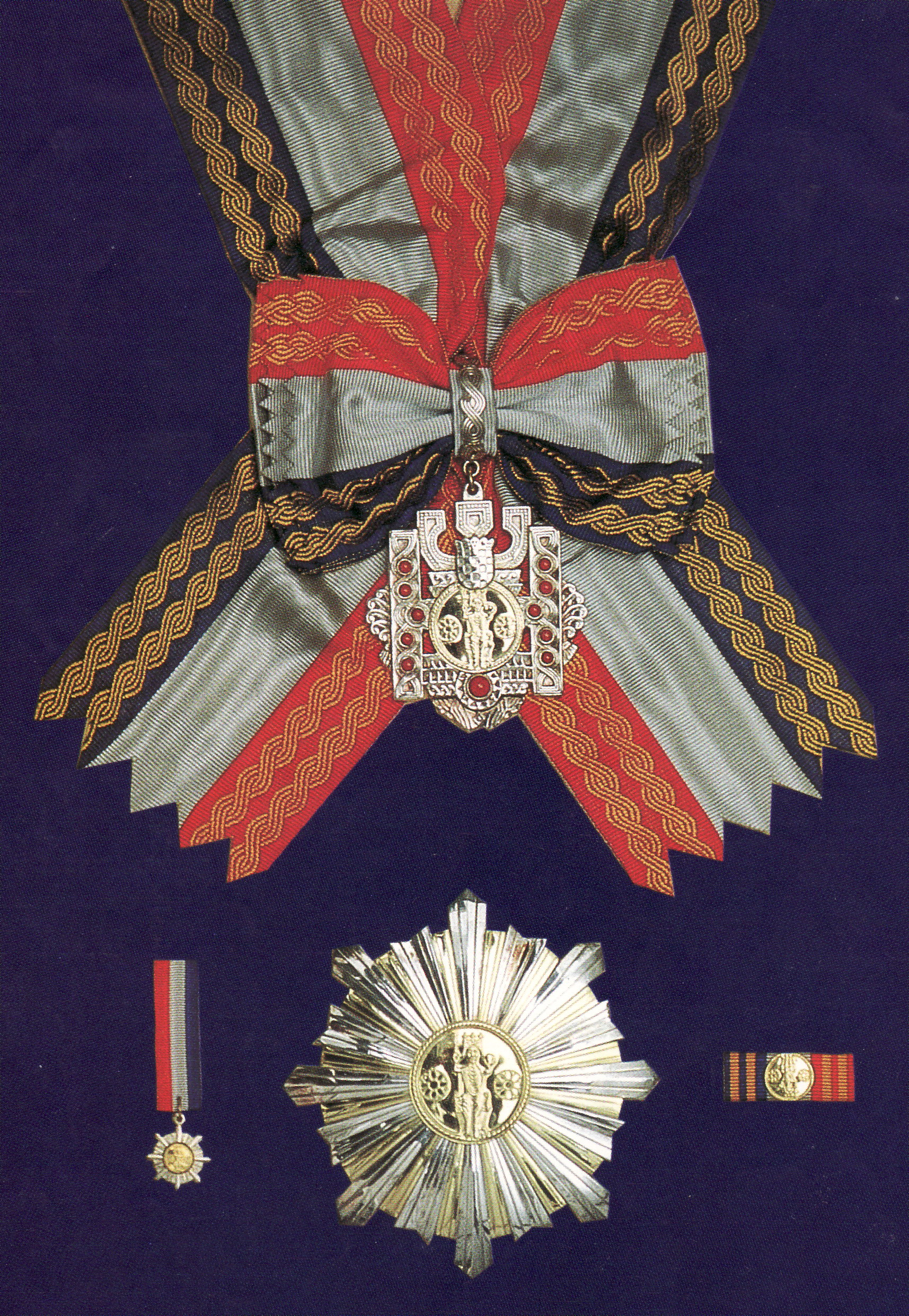
- Grand Order of King Tomislav (top: Grand Order medal with sash; bottom: Great Morning Star (Velika Danica) medal; left: smaller decorative version; right: Grand Order ribbon)
- Type: Civil decoration
- Awarded for: Contributions to the establishment of the sovereign Republic of Croatia; for exceptional contribution to its international reputation and status; for great achievements in developing international relations between Croatia and their respective countries
- Country: Republic of Croatia
- Presented by: the President of Croatia
- Eligibility: Heads of state
- Status: Currently awarded
- Established: 20 June 1992 (reconstituted 1 April 1995)
- Ribbon of the Grand Order of King Tomislav

Precedence
- Next (higher): None
- Next (lower): Grand Order of Queen Jelena

The Grand Order of King Tomislav (Croatian: Velered kralja Tomislava), or officially the Grand Order of King Tomislav with Sash and Great Morning Star (Velered kralja Tomislava s lentom i Velikom Danicom), is the highest state order of Croatia. It is usually awarded to top foreign officials for their contribution to the improvement of Croatia's good standing internationally as well as achievements in developing international relations between Croatia and their respective countries. It is awarded by the President of Croatia. The order has one class. It is named after King Tomislav of Croatia.

It was designed by Mladen Veža, and made by the Radionica primijenjenih umjetnosti from Zagreb.

== Recipients ==
- 2026 - (Sovereign Military Order of Malta) John T. Dunlap (as Grand Master of the Knights Hospitaller)
- 2022 - Gabriel Boric (as President of Chile)
- 2019 - Ilir Meta (as President of Albania)
- 2019 - Ram Nath Kovind (as President of India)
- 2018 - Marcelo Rebelo de Sousa (as President of Portugal)
- 2017 - Klaus Iohannis (as President of Romania)
- 2017 - George W. Bush (as President of the United States)
- 2017 - Tamim bin Hamad Al Thani (as Emir of Qatar)
- 2017 - Sabah Al-Ahmad Al-Jaber Al-Sabah (as Emir of Kuwait)
- 2016 - Rosen Plevneliev (as President of Bulgaria)
- 2014 - Margrethe II (as Queen of Denmark)
- 2013 - Bronisław Komorowski (as President of Poland)
- 2013 - Carl XVI Gustaf of Sweden (as King of Sweden)
- 2012 - Andris Bērziņš (as President of Latvia)
- 2011 - Giorgio Napolitano (as President of Italy)
- 2011 - Harald V of Norway (as King of Norway)
- 2009 - Tarja Halonen (as President of Finland)
- 2009 - Bamir Topi (as President of Albania)
- 2009 - Hamad bin Khalifa Al Thani (as Emir of Qatar)
- 2009 - Albert II (as Sovereign Prince of Monaco)
- 2009 - Vladimir Voronin (as President of Moldova)
- 2008 - (Sovereign Military Order of Malta) Matthew Festing (as Grand Master of the Knights Hospitaller)
- 2008 - Ivan Gašparovič (as President of Slovakia)
- 2008 - Valdis Zatlers (as President of Latvia)
- 2008 - Lech Kaczyński (as President of Poland)
- 2007 - Alfred Moisiu (as President of Albania)
- 2007 - Viktor Yushchenko (as President of Ukraine)
- 2007 - Karolos Papoulias (as President of Greece)
- 2006 - Tassos Papadopoulos (as President of Cyprus)
- 2006 - Edward Fenech-Adami (as President of Malta)
- 2005 - Stjepan Mesić (as President of Croatia, presented to him by Vladimir Šeks, as Speaker of the Croatian Parliament)
- 2004 - Ricardo Lagos (as President of Chile)
- 2003 - Ion Iliescu (as President of Romania)
- 2002 - Tuanku Syed Sirajuddin (as King of Malaysia)
- 2002 - Ferenc Mádl (as President of Hungary)
- 2002 - Elizabeth II (as Queen of the United Kingdom)
- 2001 - Milan Kučan (as President of Slovenia)
- 2001 - Carlo Azeglio Ciampi (as President of Italy)
- 2001 - Rudolf Schuster (as President of Slovakia)
- 2001 - Nursultan Nazarbayev (as President of Kazakhstan)
- 2001 - Aleksander Kwaśniewski (as President of Poland)
- 2001 - Rexhep Meidani (as President of Albania)
- 2001 - Thomas Klestil (as President of Austria)
- 2000 - Emil Constantinescu (as President of Romania)
- 1998 - Constantinos Stephanopoulos (as President of Greece)
- 1997 - Oscar Luigi Scalfaro (as President of Italy)
- 1995 - Franjo Tuđman (as the President of Croatia, presented to him by Nedjeljko Mihanović, as Speaker of the Croatian Parliament)
- 1995 - Carlos Menem (as President of Argentina)
- 1994 - Eduardo Frei Ruiz-Tagle (as President of Chile)
- 1994 - Sami Süleyman Gündoğdu Demirel (as President of Turkey)
- 1993 - Juan Antonio Samaranch (as President of the International Olympic Committee)
- 1993 - Francesco Cossiga (as lifetime senator and President of the Italy)
