= Bračević =

Settlement in Split-Dalmatia County, Croatia

- Settlement
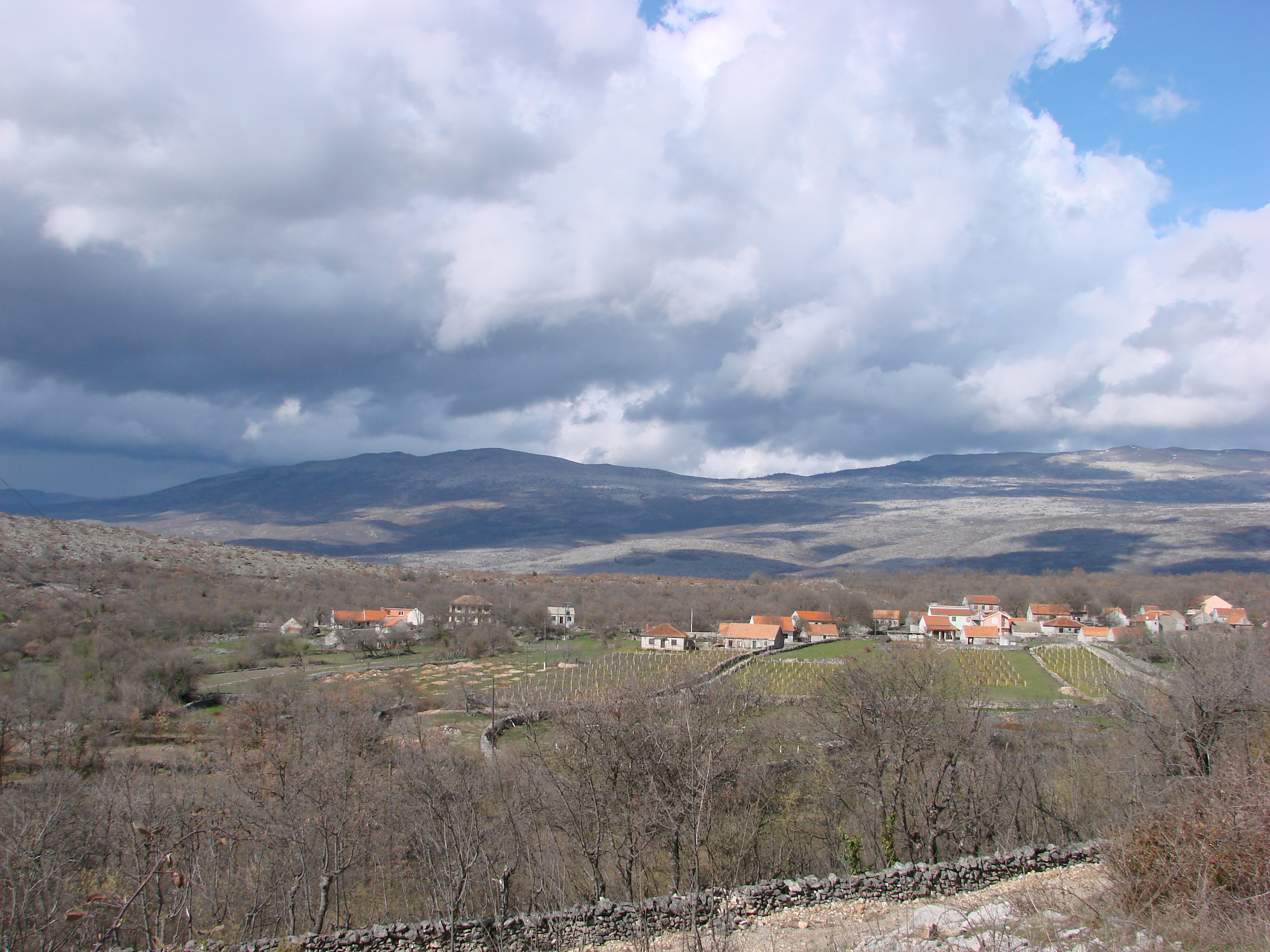
- Interactive map of Bračević
- Location of Bračević in Croatia
- Coordinates: 43°44′20″N 16°24′07″E
- Country: Croatia
- County: Split-Dalmatia
- Municipality: Muć

Area
  - Total: 19.1 km^{2} (7.4 sq mi)

Population (2021)
  - Total: 139
  - Density: 7.28/km^{2} (18.8/sq mi)
- Time zone: UTC+1 (CET)
  - Summer (DST): UTC+2 (CEST)
- Postal code: 21203 Donji Muć
- Area code: +385 (0)21

Bračević is a settlement in the Municipality of Muć in Croatia. In 2021, its population was 139.

== Demographics ==
Bračević: Population trends 1857–2021
v

population	537	502	507	521	578	742	742	895	782	764	700	588	400	267	205	182	139
	1857	1869	1880	1890	1900	1910	1921	1931	1948	1953	1961	1971	1981	1991	2001	2011	2021

Sources: Croatian Bureau of Statistics publications
