= Order of Petar Zrinski and Fran Krsto Frankopan =

Order of Petar Zrinski and Fran Krsto Frankopan Red Petra Zrinskog i Frana Krste Frankopana
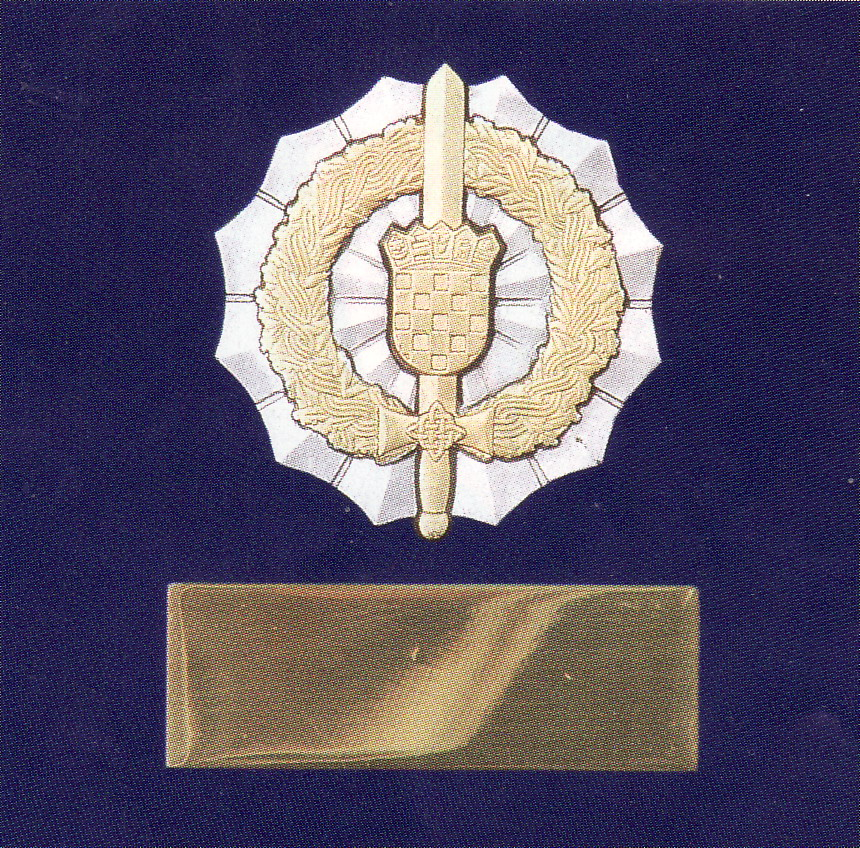
- Type: State order
- Awarded for: posthumously for valor in combat (gold) for persons declared missing in the Croatian War of Independence (silver)
- Country: Republic of Croatia
- Presented by: the President of Croatia
- Eligibility: Croatian and foreign citizens
- Status: Active
- Established: 10 March 1995

Precedence
- Next (higher): Order of Ban Jelačić
- Next (lower): Order of Ante Starčević

The Order of Petar Zrinski and Fran Krsto Frankopan (Croatian: Red Petra Zrinskog i Frana Krste Frankopana) is the 11th most important medal given by the Republic of Croatia. The order was founded on 1 April 1995. The medal is awarded with two versions of the Croatian interlace: the golden one posthumously for valor in combat, and the silver one for persons declared missing in the Croatian War of Independence. It is named after Petar Zrinski and Fran Krsto Frankopan.
