= Homeland's Gratitude Medal =

Homeland's Gratitude Medal Spomenica domovinske zahvalnosti
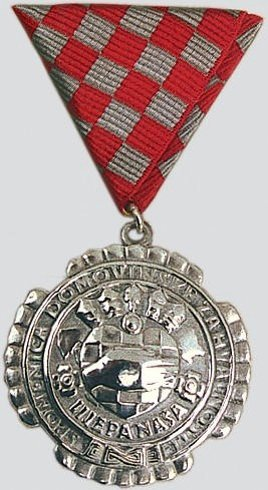
- Type: State decoration
- Country: Republic of Croatia
- Presented by: the President of Croatia
- Eligibility: Croatian citizens
- Status: Active
- Established: 10 March 1995
- Ribbon of the Commemorative Medal of the Homeland's Gratitude

Precedence
- Next (higher): Homeland War Memorial Medal
- Next (lower): none

Homeland's Gratitude Medal (Croatian: Spomenica domovinske zahvalnosti) is the 18th most important medal in the Croatian honours system.

The Homeland's Gratitude Medal is given to Croatian citizens for their exemplary service and has four classes, each for the length of service of 5, 10, 15, and 20 or more years.

== Appearance ==
The medal is of a bulged circular shape embellished with four equal rays of the stylised cross. It is made of silver 999/1000 and is 41mm in diameter. The central part of the design is a base overview of the map of Croatia covered by the stylised coat of arms of the Republic of Croatia, and an extended right hand is laid over the coat of arms. The medal has two inscriptions, the central inscription is Lijepa Naša (English: Our Beautiful), which is a colloquial name for the Republic of Croatia. The outer inscription is the title of the medal, Spomenica domovinske zahvalnosti (English: Homeland's Gratitude Medal)

== Notable recipients ==
- Imra Agotić
- Mate Boban
- Branimir Glavaš (Revoked for charges of war crimes)
- Frane Vinko Golem
- Ante Kotromanović
- Zvonko Kusić
- Slobodan Lang
- Sveto Letica
- Drago Lovrić
- Josip Lucić
- Predrag Matić
- Rudolf Perešin
- Predrag Stipanović
- Petar Stipetić
- Mirko Šundov
- Franjo Tuđman
