= Homeland War Memorial Medal =

Homeland War Memorial Medal Spomenica Domovinskog rata
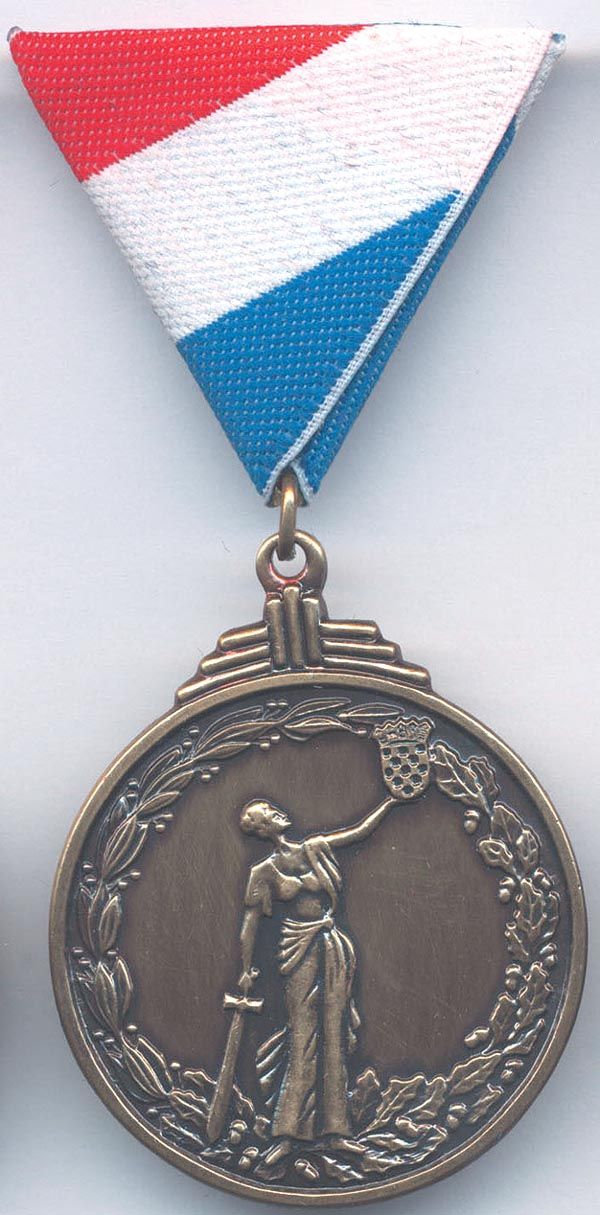
- Type: Service medal
- Awarded for: Participation in the Homeland War
- Country: Republic of Croatia
- Presented by: the President of Croatia
- Eligibility: Croatian and foreign citizens
- Status: Active
- Established: 10 March 1995

Highlights
- Total: 430,884
- Ribbon of the Homeland War Memorial Medal

Precedence
- Next (higher): Order of the Croatian Interlace
- Next (lower): Homeland's Gratitude Medal

The Homeland War Memorial (Croatian: Spomenica Domovinskog rata) is a Croatian state medal awarded to both Croatian and foreign citizens who participated in the nation's Croatian War of Independence as a volunteer, part of the Croatian Army and Croatian Council of Defence or in some other role.

The medal was widely granted, given to over 430,000 people who participated in the war in some form. Much less number has been given in its first and original form Spomenica Domovinskog rata 1990.-1992. to those who participated in the resistance and early days of the formation of the Croatian state and army in the period 1990-1992, and as such was established on the 9th of June 1992.

== Notable recipients ==
- Imra Agotic
- Mate Boban
- Radimir Čačić
- Zvonimir Cervenko
- Frane Vinko Golem
- Josip Jovic
- Ante Kotromanovic
- Slobodan Lang
- Sveto Letica
- Bekim Berisha
- Josip Lucic
- Predrag Matić
- Rudolf Perešin
- Željko Reiner
- Daniel Srb
- Predrag Stipanović
- Petar Stipetić - (Chief of the General Staff of the Armed Forces of the Republic of Croatia)
- Franjo Tuđman - (as the President of Croatia, presented to him by Nedjeljko Mihanović, the President of Sabor)
