= Medal for Participation in Operation Storm =

Croatian medal

Medal for Participation in Operation Storm Medalja Oluja
- Type: Military
- Awarded for: Participation in Operation Storm
- Country: Republic of Croatia
- Presented by: the President of Croatia
- Eligibility: Croatian and foreign citizens
- Status: Active
- Established: 1 April 1995
- Ribbon of the Medal for Participation in Operation Storm

The Medal for Participation in Operation Storm (Croatian: Medalja Oluja) is a medal awarded by the Republic of Croatia for participation in Operation Storm. The medal was founded on 1 April 1995.
