= Order of the Croatian Trefoil =

Order of the Croatian Trefoil Red hrvatskog trolista
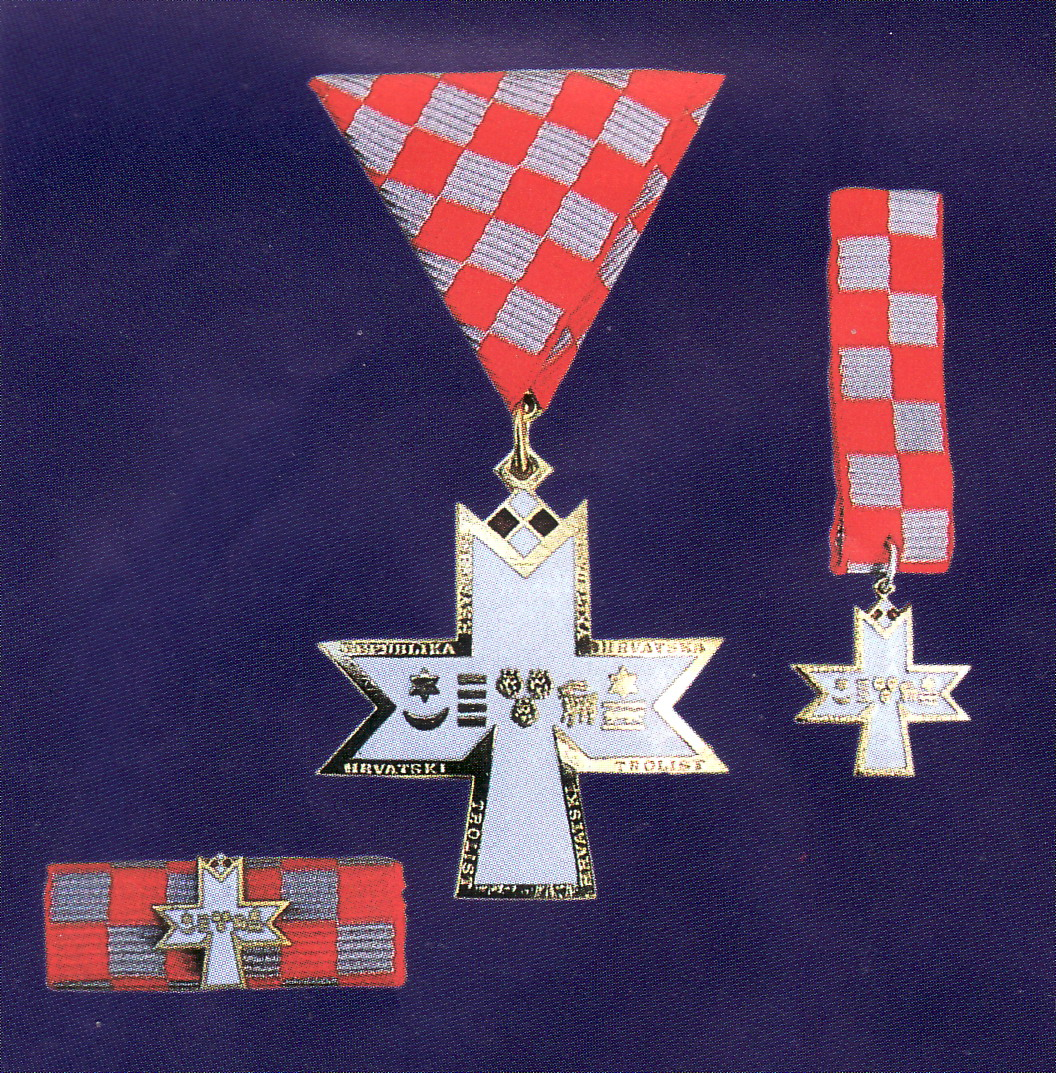
- Badge and ribbon of the order
- Type: Order of merit
- Awarded for: Heroic acts committed in time of war, in danger of war and peace in extraordinary circumstances.
- Country: Republic of Croatia
- Presented by: the President of Croatia
- Eligibility: Croatian and foreign citizens.
- Established: 1 April 1995
- First award: Slavko Burda
- Final award: Ivica Bagarić

Highlights
- Total: 37
- Ribbon bar of the order

Precedence
- Next (higher): Order of the Croatian Cross
- Next (lower): Order of the Croatian Interlace

The Order of the Croatian Trefoil (Croatian: Red hrvatskog trolista) is the sixteenth most important medal given by the Republic of Croatia. The order was founded on 1 April 1995. The medal is awarded for excellence in war, direct war danger or in extraordinary circumstances in peacetime.

Recipients are Anton Tus, who served as a colonel general and the chief of staff of the Yugoslav Air Force before becoming the chief of general staff of the Armed Forces of the Republic of Croatia, Vasily Sikorski, a Croatian wartime reporter, and diplomat to Ukraine, Slavko Burda, Ivan Čehok a previous mayor of Varaždin, Josip Đakić member of Croatian parliament, Vesna Getoš (Posthumously), Vesna Girardi-Jurkić an archeologist, museologist and ex minister of education, Antun Hila (Posthumous), Žarko Inhof, Damir Junušić, Zlatko Kajmić, dr. Boris Kandare, Vladimir Kopf (Posthumous), Zvonko Kovač, Ivan Križić, Darko Matić, Ana Matoš, Zlatko Menges, Željko Mikić, Ivan Minčir, Antun Palarić, dr. Jurica Pavelić, dr. Ante Pavelić, Franjo Petrović, Ivan Raguž, Marijan Ramušćak, Željko Ronta, Kreško Slatković, Stipo Šermet, dr. Marko Škreb, Krešimir Šlafhauzer, Ivan Stark (Posthumous), Vladimir Štengl, Miro Turalija, Ivica Turkalj, Miljenko Vranić, Goran Zobundžija (Posthumous), Ivan Žigrović and Ivica Bagarić.

== See also ==
- Military Order of the Iron Trefoil
