= Order of Ban Jelačić =

Order of Ban Jelačić Red bana Jelačića
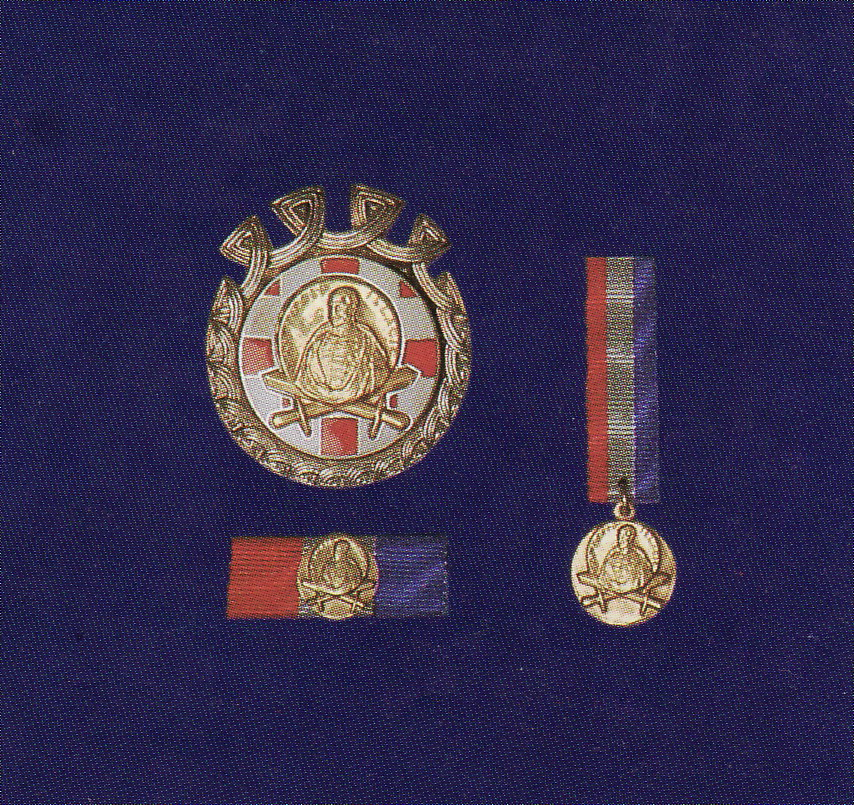
- Order of Ban Jelačić (top: Order medal; right: smaller decorative version; left: Order ribbon)
- Type: Military
- Awarded for: excellence in the service of Armed Forces of the Republic of Croatia
- Country: Republic of Croatia
- Presented by: the President of Croatia
- Eligibility: Officers of the Armed Forces of the Republic of Croatia
- Status: Active
- Established: 1 April 1995
- Ribbon of the Order of Ban Jelačić

Precedence
- Next (higher): Order of Nikola Šubić Zrinski
- Next (lower): Order of Petar Zrinski and Fran Krsto Frankopan

The Order of Ban Jelačić (Croatian: Red bana Jelačića) is the 10th most important medal given by the Republic of Croatia. The order was founded on 1 April 1995. The medal is awarded for excellence in the Armed Forces of the Republic of Croatia. It is named after the ban of Croatia Josip Jelačić.

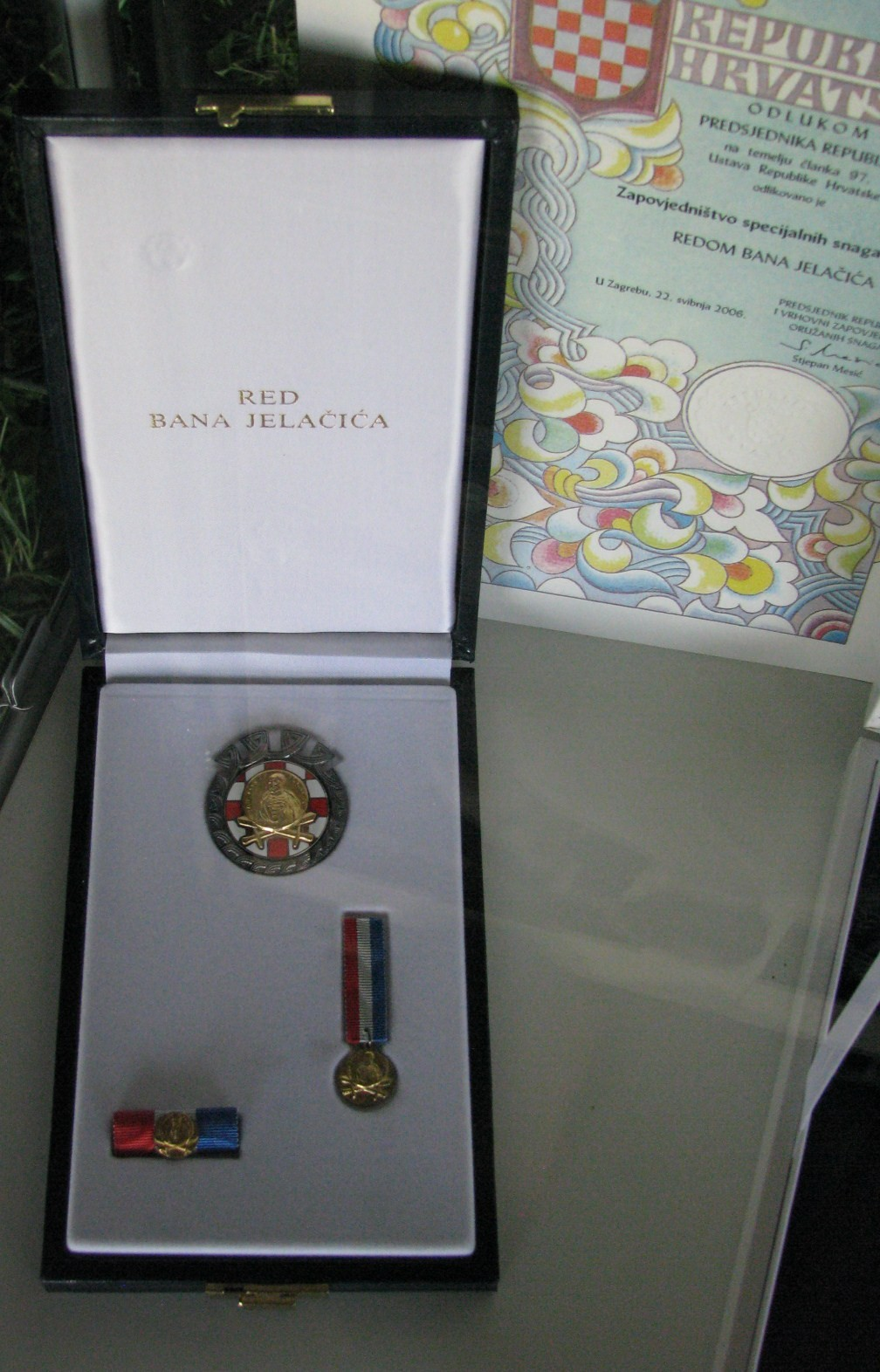
Order of Ban Jelačić awarded to the Command of the Special Forces of the Ministry of the Interior 22 May 2006
