= Order of the Croatian Interlace =

Order of the Croatian Interlace Red hrvatskog pletera
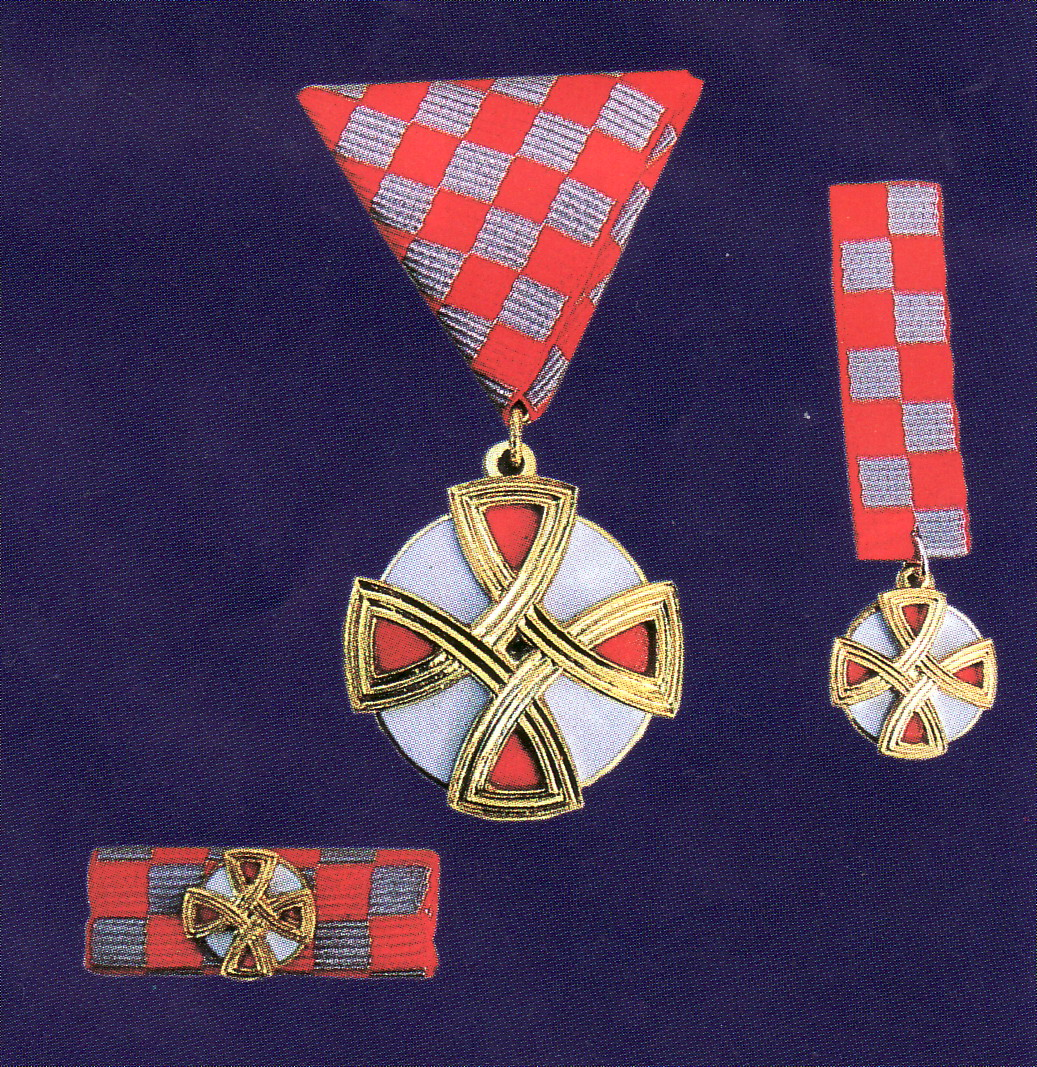
- Type: State order
- Awarded for: advancement of progress and reputation of Croatia and the welfare of its citizens
- Country: Republic of Croatia
- Presented by: the President of Croatia
- Eligibility: Croatian and foreign citizens
- Status: Active
- Established: 1 April 1995
- Ribbon of the Order of the Croatian Interlace

Precedence
- Next (higher): Order of the Croatian Trefoil
- Next (lower): Homeland War Memorial Medal

The Order of the Croatian Interlace or Order of the Early Croatian three-strand pattern (Croatian: Red hrvatskog pletera) is the seventeenth most important medal given by the Republic of Croatia. The order was founded on 1 April 1995. The medal is awarded for advancement of progress and reputation of Croatia and the welfare of its citizens. It is named after the Croatian Interlace, a traditional Croatian ornamental design, an interwoven series of branches used as a wall or barrier.
