= Order of Nikola Šubić Zrinski =

Order of Nikola Šubić Zrinski Red Nikole Šubića Zrinskog
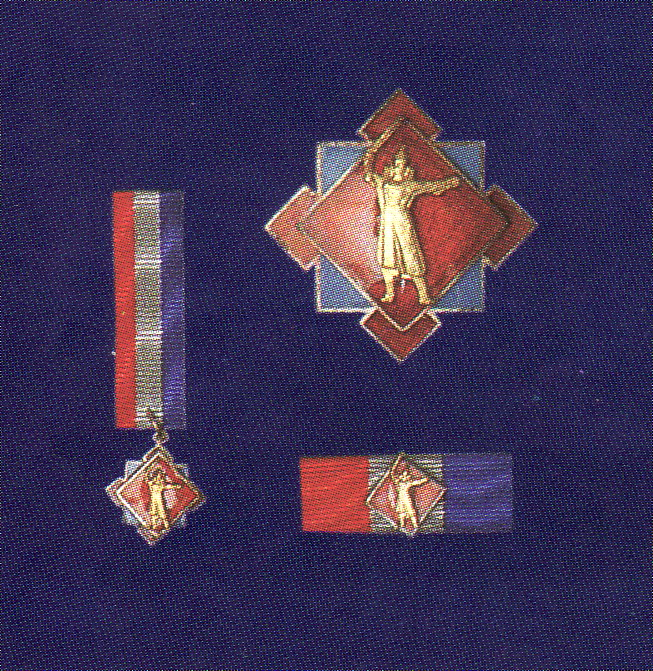
- Type: Military
- Awarded for: a heroic act in war or imminent danger of war, or exceptional circumstances in peace.
- Country: Republic of Croatia
- Presented by: the President of Croatia
- Eligibility: Croatian and foreign citizens
- Status: Active
- Established: 1 April 1995
- Ribbon of the Order of Nikola Šubić Zrinski

Precedence
- Next (higher): Order of Duke Domagoj
- Next (lower): Order of Ban Jelačić

The Order of Nikola Šubić Zrinski (Croatian: Red Nikole Šubića Zrinskog) is the 9th most important medal given by the Republic of Croatia. The order was founded on 1 April 1995. The medal is awarded for a heroic act in war or imminent danger of war, or exceptional circumstances in peace. It is named after the ban of Croatia Nikola IV Zrinski.

== See also ==
- Orders, decorations, and medals of Croatia
