= Wings of Storm =

- Wings of Storm insignia
- Active: 2003–present
- Country: Croatia
- Branch: Croatian Air Force
- Role: Aerobatic display team
- Size: 6 pilots
- Garrison/HQ: Zemunik Airbase
- Colors: Red, white and blue

Aircraft flown
- Trainer: 6 × Pilatus PC-9M

The Wings of Storm (Croatian: Krila Oluje) is the Croatian Air Force aerobatic display team. Its task is the presentation of the skill, discipline, and teamwork of the Croatian Air Force.

The team 'Krila Oluje' consists of pilots from the 93rd Military airbase Zemunik. In comparison with the majority of aerobatic teams in the world whose pilots' single task is to train and do aerobatic team performances, the primary task of the pilots from the 'Krila Oluje' is training of the future Croatian air force pilots.

Captain Diana Doboš, who was the member of 'Krila Oluje' from 2005 to 2007 became the third woman in the world to fly in an aerobatic team.

The first flight of the team was at an aerobatic performance with a formation of four aircraft, during the opening ceremony of the European sailing championship in Zadar on 23 July 2004. On the 5th of August 2005, in Knin, for the celebration of the 10th anniversary of the military and police operation known as 'Oluja' (after which the team was named), the team 'Krila Oluje' was officially presented to the Croatian public. By the end of the year the team grew to a five-plane formation, and first flight with a six-plane formation was made on 25 March 2009.

The team candidates are chosen from flight instructors who meet the conditions of excellent flying technique, have the required psychophysical predispositions, show teamwork and have a minimum of 600 flight hours. The candidates go through a training of aerobatic flying in formations ranging from two to six airplanes.

Performance of the 'Wings of Storm' over Jarun, Zagreb

During the performance, the aircraft fly at distances less than 2 m from each other, at speeds of up to 550 km/h and the loads that the pilots endure are from -2.5 g to +6.5 g.

The program performed by the 'Krila Oluje' is 23 minutes long and is performed at the altitudes from 50 to 1000 m and at the minimum distance from the audience of about 230 m. A narrator presents the program to the spectators. His task is also to pilot the team's backup plane. There are no backup pilots - in case a pilot is ill the team performs a shortened program with five planes or makes a cancellation of the performance.

For training and displays, the 'Krila Oluje' do not have specific aircraft and equipment, as the majority of display teams in the world do, instead they use the aircraft from the Squadron of 93rd Air Base.

On March 4, 2015 all six pilots submitted their request to end their military service and leave the Air Force, thus effectively disbanding the Wings of Storm a few months before their tenth anniversary. According to several media, the pilots received a superior offer from Qatar, where they would be flying the PC-21.

The team has been reformed with new pilots and continues to fly in 2015. On their debut at RIAT 2016 (Royal International Air Tattoo) team won "King Hussein Memorial Sword" for the best overall flying demonstration and at SIAF 2017 (Slovak International Air Fest) team has been awarded for the most precise flying demonstration. In addition, Wings of Storm received awards for the best performances at the CIAF 2012, CIAF 2014 (Czech Republic) and RDAF 2012 (Denmark) international air shows.

'Wings of Storm' during aero meeting “Zigermeet 2019” in Zurich

== Acknowledgements ==
- City of Zadar Award: 2013
- INTERSTAS: 2025
- MORH commendation: 2025

== Bibliography ==
- (in Croatian) Croatian Soldier (military magazine), August, 2009
