= Croatian military ranks =

The Croatian military ranks are the military insignia used by the Armed Forces of Croatia.

== Commissioned officer ranks ==
The rank insignia of commissioned officers.

NATO code	OF-10	OF-9	OF-8	OF-7	OF-6	OF-5	OF-4	OF-3	OF-2	OF-1
Croatian Army
Croatian Army	Stožerni general	General zbora	General pukovnik	General bojnik	Brigadni general	Brigadir	Pukovnik	Bojnik	Satnik	Natporučnik	Poručnik
Croatian Navy
Croatian Navy	Admiral flote	Admiral	Viceadmiral	Kontraadmiral	Komodor	Kapetan bojnog broda	Kapetan fregate	Kapetan korvete	Poručnik bojnog broda	Poručnik fregate	Poručnik korvete
Croatian Air Force
Croatian Air Force	Stožerni general	General zbora	General pukovnik	General bojnik	Brigadni general	Brigadir	Pukovnik	Bojnik	Satnik	Natporučnik	Poručnik
NATO code	OF-10	OF-9	OF-8	OF-7	OF-6	OF-5	OF-4	OF-3	OF-2	OF-1

=== Abolished ranks ===
Abolished ranks
Insignia	Vrhovnik
Established	22 March 1995
Abolished	19 March 2002

== Other ranks ==
The rank insignia of non-commissioned officers and enlisted personnel.

NATO code	OR-9	OR-8	OR-7	OR-6	OR-5	OR-4	OR-3	OR-2	OR-1
Croatian Army									No insignia
Croatian Army	Časnički namjesnik	Stožerni narednik	Nadnarednik	Narednik	Desetnik	Skupnik	Razvodnik	Pozornik	Vojnik
Croatian Navy									No insignia
Croatian Navy	Časnički namjesnik	Stožerni narednik	Nadnarednik	Narednik	Desetnik	Skupnik	Razvodnik	Pozornik	Mornar
Croatian Air Force									No insignia
Croatian Air Force	Časnički namjesnik	Stožerni narednik	Nadnarednik	Narednik	Desetnik	Skupnik	Razvodnik	Pozornik	Vojnik
NATO code	OR-9	OR-8	OR-7	OR-6	OR-5	OR-4	OR-3	OR-2	OR-1

== Former rank structure ==
In the 1990s, including the Croatian War of Independence, a slightly different rank structure was used.

=== Officer ranks ===
Rank group	General / flag officers					Senior officers			Junior officers
Croatian Army (c. 1995)
Croatian Army (c. 1995)	Stožerni general	General zbora	General pukovnik	General bojnik	Stožerni brigadir	Brigadir	Pukovnik	Bojnik	Satnik	Natporučnik	Poručnik	Zastavnik
Croatian Navy (c. 1995)
Croatian Navy (c. 1995)	Stožerni admiral	Admiral	Viceadmiral	Kontraadmiral	Komodor	Kapetan bojnog broda	Kapetan fregate	Kapetan korvete	Poručnik bojnog broda	Poručnik fregate	Poručnik korvete	Zastavnik
Croatian Air Force (c. 1995)
Croatian Air Force (c. 1995)	Stožerni general	General zbora	General pukovnik	General bojnik	Stožerni brigadir	Brigadir	Pukovnik	Bojnik	Satnik	Natporučnik	Poručnik	Zastavnik

=== Other ranks ===
Rank group	Senior NCOs				Junior NCOs		Enlisted
Croatian Army (c. 1995)								No insignia
Croatian Army (c. 1995)	Časnički namjesnik	Stožerni narednik	Narednik	Vodnik	Desetnik	Razvodnik	Pozornik	Vojnik
Croatian Navy (c. 1995)								No insignia
Croatian Navy (c. 1995)	Časnički namjesnik	Stožerni narednik	Narednik	Vodnik	Desetnik	Razvodnik	Pozornik	Mornar
Croatian Air Force (c. 1995)								No insignia
Croatian Air Force (c. 1995)	Časnički namjesnik	Stožerni narednik	Narednik	Vodnik	Desetnik	Razvodnik	Pozornik	Vojnik

== See also ==
- Military ranks of the Independent State of Croatia
- Military ranks of Socialist Yugoslavia
