= Roulettes =

Royal Australian Air Force aerobatic display team

Royal Australian Air Force Roulettes
- RAAF Roulettes seal
- Active: 1970 – present
- Country: Australia
- Branch: Royal Australian Air Force
- Type: Aerobatic display team
- Size: Seven pilots
- Garrison/HQ: RAAF Central Flying School (CFS); RAAF Base East Sale, Victoria
- Colors: Red and White

Aircraft flown
- Trainer: 7 Pilatus PC-21 (incl. one spare)

The Roulettes are the Royal Australian Air Force's formation aerobatic display team. They provide about 150 flying displays a year, in Australia and in friendly countries around the Southeast Asian region. The Roulettes form part of the RAAF Central Flying School (CFS) at RAAF Base East Sale, Victoria.

== History and organisation ==
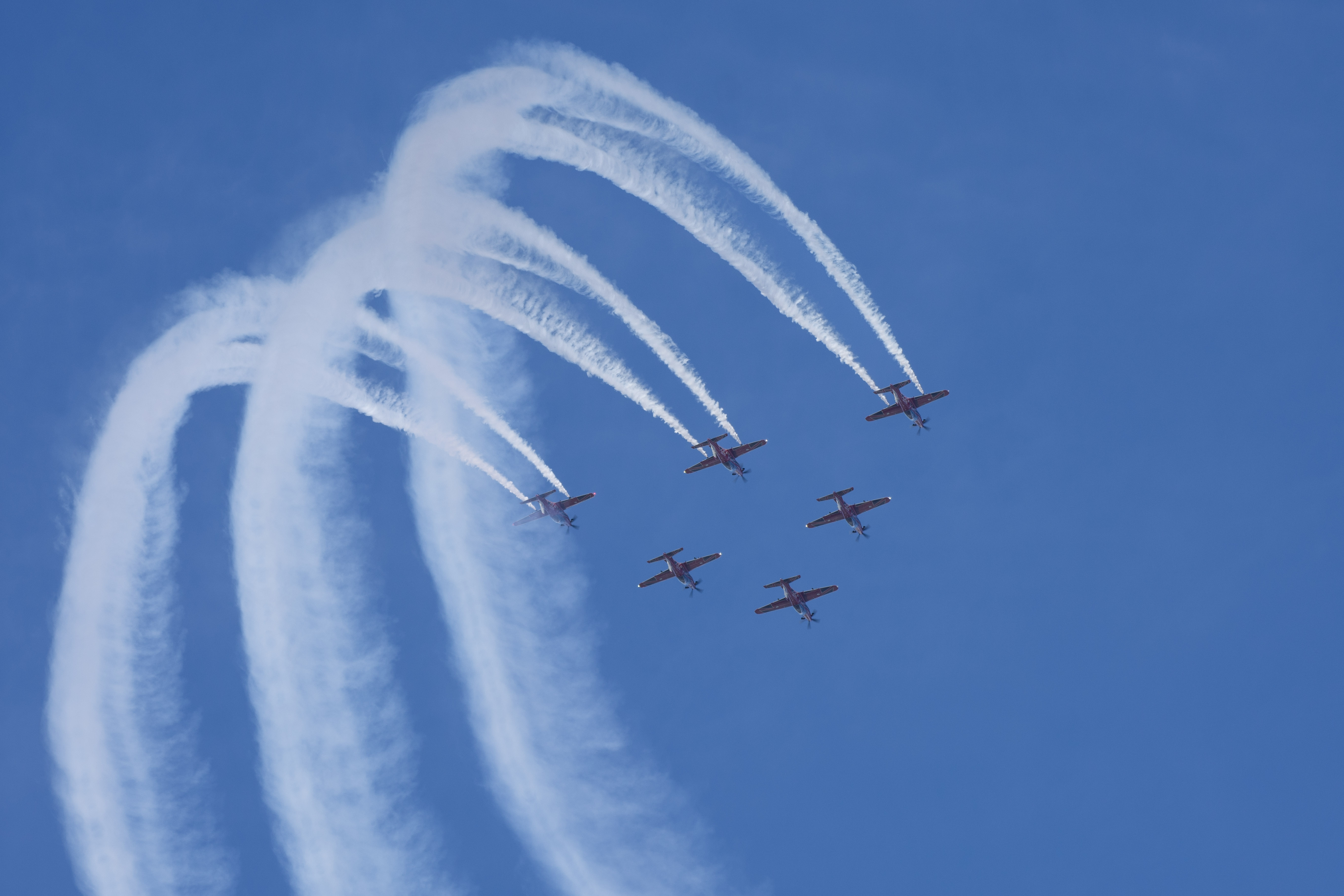
RAAF Roulettes Display At Hobart On The 9th Of February 2026

The Central Flying School formed its first official aerobatic team in 1962, the Red Sales, using De Havilland Vampire Mk 35 jet trainers. On 15 August 1962 the team was involved in a major incident with the loss of six lives and four aircraft. The Telstars were formed in Feb 1963 still using Vampire aircraft. They were re-equipped with Macchi MB-326 aircraft in Feb 1968, but were disbanded in Apr 1968 due to budget restraints.

In 1970, the Roulettes were formed to celebrate the RAAF's 50th anniversary to be held throughout the year of 1971. The Roulettes first air show was at Point Cook in Dec 1970. Their last air show using the Macchi was at Lakes Entrance in June 1989. Initially, they were equipped with four Macchis, growing to five aircraft in 1974 and seven in 1981 before cost-cutting saw the team reduced to five again in 1982. Towards the end of the 1980s, the Roulettes flying hours had to be reduced as the MB-326 fleet developed premature metal fatigue problems and a replacement aircraft type was investigated. In 1989, with the new Pilatus PC-9 trainers starting to arrive and MB-326 airframe hours severely limited, the Roulettes flew just a single pair of Macchis. The Roulettes switched over to the new PC-9s in late 1989, and arrived at the composition they have used ever since: six PC-9s plus a spare.

The aircraft are painted in the bold red, white and blue scheme, with a large "R" symbol on the tail. The RAAF has since adopted this scheme (minus the "R") for all its PC-9 trainers, except for the PC-9s at ARDU and FAC, which allows an aircraft to be swapped into or out of the team to equalise fleet airframe hours by simply repainting the tail.

=== Pilots ===
There are seven Roulettes pilots at any given time, and gaining appointment to the team is a rare distinction. All are flying instructors, except number seven, who serves as the commentator and ferry pilot for the spare aircraft.

From time to time, the CO of an RAAF operational squadron recommends a pilot for instructor duties with either the Basic Flying Training School at Tamworth, NSW or at 2 Flying Training School at Pearce, WA. Upon progression through several levels of instructor categorisation, some of these pilots are then selected for duty at the Central Flying School, where they train flying instructors. From the 21 CFS senior instructors, the CFS commanding officer and the Roulette leader then offer selected individuals a chance to try out for the Roulettes. The team is organised in 'seasons' lasting six months; most members serve on the team for three seasons before moving on to other duties.

A pilot begins with three months of intensive formation aerobatic training, starting with relatively simple manoeuvres (such as loops and rolls in echelon or line astern) performed at altitude, and progressing through more complex and demanding ones (such as corkscrews, ripple rolls and rollbacks), close formation line abreast aerobatics (which requires constant fine attention to power and trim settings), and eventually working up to the full six-aircraft display routines. Only when a routine is well-practised at altitude is it brought down in gradual steps to the minimum safe level of 500 feet (150 m). First season pilots fly as Roulettes 2, 3 or 4, while the more experienced pilots fly as Roulettes 5 and 6. Roulette 1 is the team leader, and Roulette 7 flying the spare aircraft is responsible for public relations and often provides commentary at flying displays.

=== Accidents ===
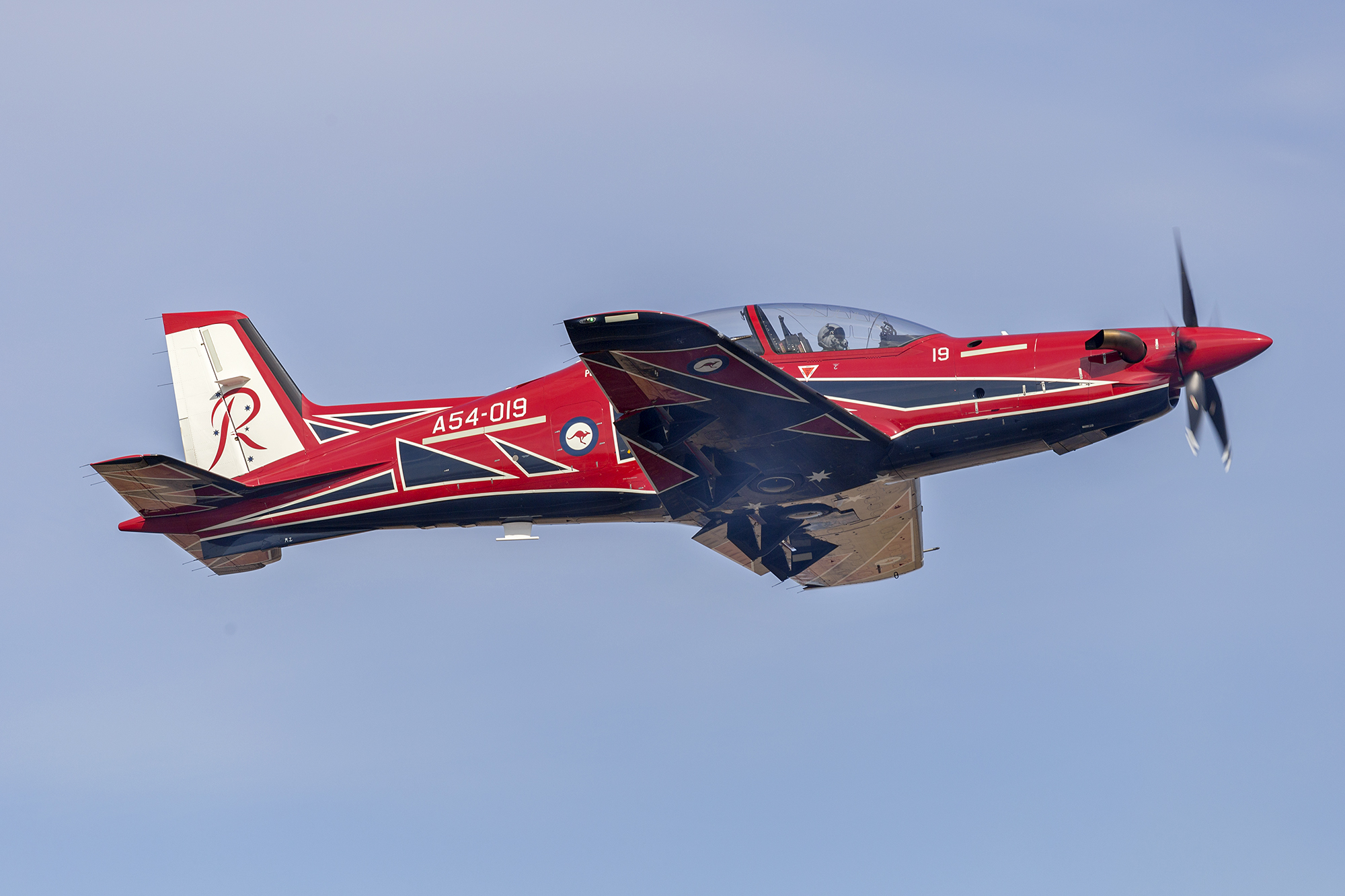
A Pilatus PC-21 Roulette in March 2019

The Roulettes have had three accidents over the years:

- In 1983, two Macchis collided during practice near Sale and both pilots were killed;
- In 1988, a mid-air collision saw Roulette 4 eject safely and Roulette 1 perform a gear-up landing; and
- In 2005, another mid-air collision occurred during practice, one pilot ejected safely and the other landed his aircraft safely, although it was badly damaged.

The Roulettes always fly in formation, except on long transits to interstate airshows where they fly a very loose formation. In poor visibility, they close up to maintain visual contact, only executing a separation drill when visibility drops below two metres.

=== Incidents ===
In February 2011, a RAAF PC-9 suffered an engine fire at RAAF Base Pearce, just north of Perth. The Roulettes were then grounded until an investigation was carried out and they could confirm that the planes were safe to fly. As of 4 March 2011, there were six planes flying at the Avalon Airshow.

== Aircraft used ==
In 2019, the Roulettes replaced the Pilatus PC-9 with the Pilatus PC-21, which was selected to replace the former as the RAAF's basic and advanced trainer under the AIR5428 project. Prior to the PC-9/A the Roulettes operated the Aermacchi MB-326H.
