= Blue Phoenix =

Civilian aerobatic display team

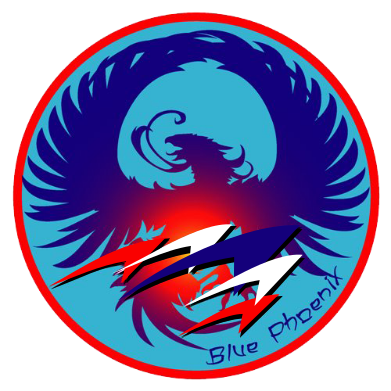
- Blue Phoenix emblem
- Active: 2012
- Country: Thailand
- Branch: Royal Thai Air Force
- Type: Aerobatic display team
- Garrison/HQ: Flying Training School, Kamphaeng Saen Air Force Base

Aircraft flown
- Trainer: Five Pilatus PC-9s

Blue Phoenix are the first ever formed Royal Thai Air Force Aerobatic Team, which fly five blue, white and red painted Pilatus PC-9 aircraft, all fitted with white smoke generators. The team is a part of Flying Training School RTAF Squadron based at Nakhon Pathom's Kamphaeng Saen Air Force Base, and so the pilots are instructors from the same squadron. Blue Phoenix inheriting the aerobatic flying spirit from their former very own aerobatic team of the RTAF Flying School called “Sean Mueang” that was disbanded several decades ago.

RTAF use the immortal phoenix bird to represent the spirit of aviation of RTAF to remember the work of RTAF founding father work gave the birth of aviation in Thailand. It is also a symbol of the rebirth of aerobatic team of RTAF.

The team was formed in the beginning of 2012 to mark the 100th anniversary of Thai Aviation. The team made their first public display on Children's Day 2012 at Don Mueang Force Air Base.
