= Stožerni general =

Highest rank in the Croatian Army

General of the army Stožerni general
- Army and Air force insignia
- Country: Croatia
- Service branch: Croatian Army; Croatian Air Force
- Rank: Five star
- NATO rank code: OF-10
- Next higher rank: None
- Next lower rank: General zbora
- Equivalent ranks: Admiral flote

Stožerni general (literally "Staff General", usually translated as "General of the army") is the highest rank in the Croatian Army and the Croatian Air Force branches of the Armed Forces of Croatia. It corresponds to Admiral flote ("Admiral of the fleet") rank used in the Croatian Navy.

Stožerni general corresponds to other five-star ranks in other militaries, and is designated as code OF-10 according to NATO rank classification.

== People awarded the rank ==
A total of six men have attained this rank since the foundation of the Croatian Armed Forces in 1991, none of whom have been in active duty since 2005.

Name	Retired	Lifespan
Martin Špegelj	1992	1927–2014
Janko Bobetko	1995	1919–2003
Zvonimir Červenko	1996	1926–2001
Petar Stipetić	2003	1937–2018
Anton Tus	2005	1931–2023
Gojko Šušak^{†}	–	1945–1998

- ^{†} Gojko Šušak died in office while serving as Croatian Defence Minister and was awarded the rank posthumously in 1998.

== See also ==
- Croatian military ranks
- Five-star rank
