= Pilatus PC-9 =

Single-engine, low-wing tandem-seat turboprop military training aircraft

PC-9
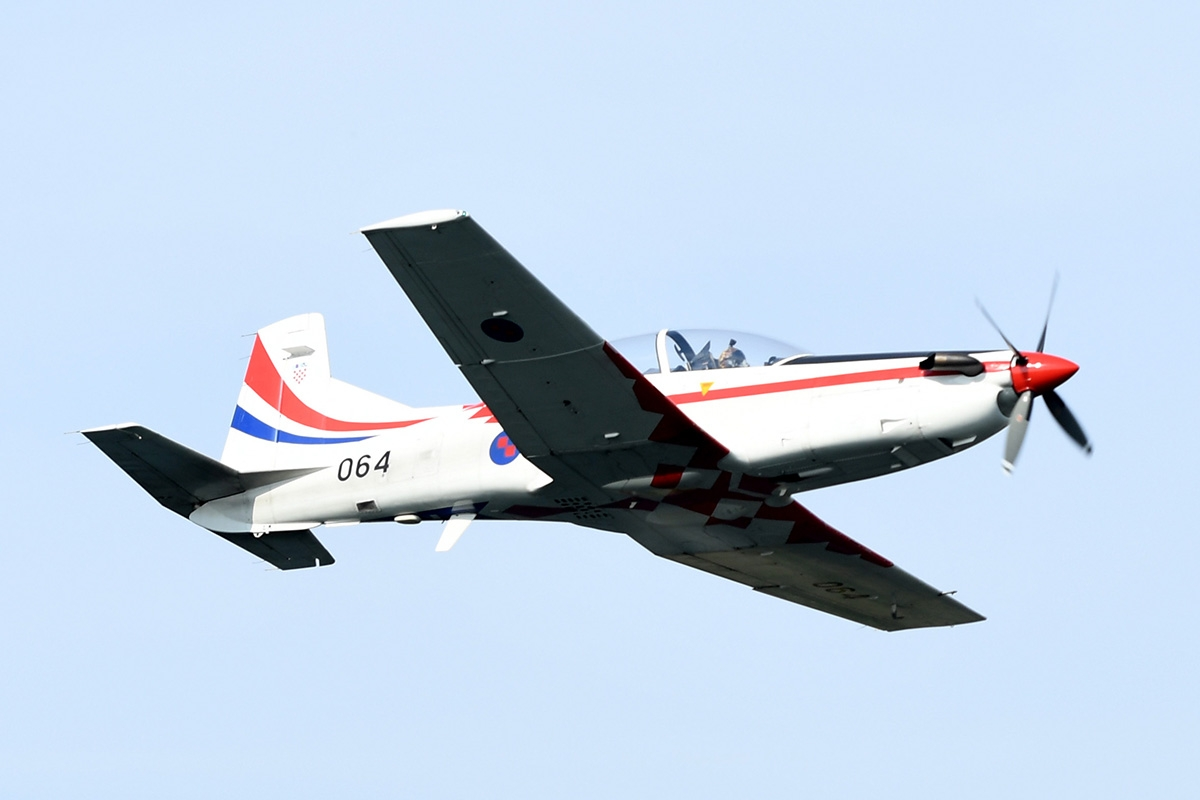
- Pilatus PC-9M of the Croatian Air Force

General information
- Type: Basic/advanced trainer aircraft
- National origin: Switzerland
- Manufacturer: Pilatus Aircraft
- Status: Active service
- Primary users: Swiss Air Force Slovenian Air Force and Air Defence; Royal Saudi Air Force; Royal Thai Air Force; Irish Air Corps
- Number built: 265

History
- Manufactured: 1984–present
- First flight: 7 May 1984
- Developed from: Pilatus PC-7
- Developed into: T-6 Texan II

The Pilatus PC-9 is a single-engine, low-wing tandem-seat turboprop training aircraft designed and manufactured by Pilatus Aircraft of Switzerland.

Developed as a more powerful evolution of the preceding Pilatus PC-7, the PC-9 features an enlarged cockpit and a ventral airbrake while possessing only a low level of structural commonality with its predecessor. During May 1985, the maiden flight of the prototype PC-9 was conducted; four months later, type certification was received and permitting deliveries to commence that same year. During the mid-1980s, Pilatus teamed up with British Aerospace to market the PC-9; the first production order for the type was placed by the Royal Saudi Air Force.

Production of the PC-9 has continued into the twenty-first century and in excess of 250 aircraft have been produced across five different variants. One of these variants, the Beechcraft T-6A Texan II, has been produced under licence by the American firm Beechcraft in the United States. The PC-9 has also been assembled by the Australian company Hawker de Havilland. The PC-9 has been employed by a number of military and civilian operators around the world, including the Swiss Air Force, Croatian Air Force, Royal Thai Air Force and the Irish Air Corps. It has been flown by aerobatics teams, such as the Royal Thai Air Force's Blue Phoenix and the Royal Australian Air Force's Roulettes. Furthermore, the type has occasionally been involved in combat operations.

== Design and development ==
=== Background ===
The origins of the PC-9 can be traced back to the earlier PC-7 from which it evolved. This preceding trainer aircraft had been developed during the mid-1970s and became one of the most successful turboprop trainers of that decade. Rapid changes in the global trainer market, particularly the availability of more powerful fighter and light attack aircraft, led to training syllabuses undergoing major shifts and impacted customer expectations for trainer aircraft. Specifically, operators sought to reduce the number of stages and aircraft types involved in training in order to reduce both time and cost.

During the early 1980s, Pilatus commenced work on a series of design studies towards what would become the PC-9. From the onset, the PC-9 was designed to function as both an ab initio and advanced trainer without the need for an intermediate stage. It is suitable for performing primary, intermediate, transition, aerobatic and weapons training, amongst other tasks.

The PC-9 is a tandem-seat single-engine military trainer aircraft capable of relatively high performance. In comparison to the PC-7, this new aircraft was almost 300 kg heavier, possessing a lengthened nose along with an elongated cockpit and canopy. It was largely an all-new design, despite the similarities to its predecessor. Amongst other improvements, the ejection seats within the cockpit were stepped (providing better visibility from the rear position) while a ventral airbrake was also added.

=== Launch and flight testing ===
During 1982, the PC-9 program was officially launched. Although some aerodynamic elements were tested on a PC-7 during 1982 and 1983, the maiden flight of the first PC-9 prototype took place on 7 May 1984. A second prototype flew on 20 July of the same year; this prototype featured all the standard electronic flight instrumentation and environmental control systems installed and was thus almost fully representative of the production version. While not fitted as standard, a head-up display (HUD) and onboard oxygen generation system could be optionally fitted.

During 1984, Pilatus teamed up with British Aerospace to promote the PC-9 to fill a requirement to replace the Royal Air Force’s (RAF) BAC Jet Provost trainer fleet. In September 1985, type certification was achieved. However, by this point, the PC-9 had lost the RAF trainer competition to the Short Tucano. However, the marketing links that Pilatus built up with British Aerospace during this competition remained in place, and reportedly contributed to the type's first order, for 30 aircraft, being received from Saudi Arabia.

=== Into production and further development ===
During 1985, quantity production of an initial batch of 10 aircraft commenced. In December of that year, a key early order for 67 PC-9s was received from the Royal Australian Air Force (RAAF). On 19 May 1987, the first production aircraft for the Royal Australian Air Force (RAAF) performed its maiden flight. Pilatus referred to the Australian aircraft by the designation PC-9/A, as they were produced under licence in Australia by Hawker de Havilland and featured extensive Australian-sourced materials and components. During 1992, the final Australian-built PC-9 was delivered.

In the early 1990s, Pilatus worked with the American aircraft manufacturer Beechcraft to jointly develop the Beech Pilatus PC-9 Mk. II, an extensively modified version of the PC-9, that was entered into the United States JPATS procurement programme. Subsequently rebranded as the Beechcraft T-6A Texan II, the aircraft emerged victorious in June 1995. Shortly thereafter, Beechcraft established a US-based assembly line and commenced production of the type. Over 700 aircraft are to be built for the United States Air Force and United States Navy

By 2000, the original PC-9 model was not being actively produced, although the type remained available for customers to order. Ten years later, production of the type (with the exception of the T-6 Texan II) had been halted; Pilatus was reportedly prepared to restart production if further orders were secured. Approximately 276 PC-9s had reportedly been delivered by this point.

== Operational history ==
While the vast majority of PC-9s were sold to military operators, at least 15 were believed to have been sold to commercial or civilian entities. At one point, the German airline Condor operated 10 PC-9s that have been configured to perform target-towing duties. During early 2023, the German branch of Qinetiq acquired nine secondhand PC-9Bs, adding to the three aircraft it already operated, which it used to provide aerial training services, attack controller and close air support training to external parties including the German armed forces.

On 22 March 1991, a pair of United States Air Force F-15C Eagles were patrolling over Iraqi airspace, as part of Operation Provide Comfort, when they detected two contacts on radar, after which the F-15s approached to visually identify them - a PC-9 and a Sukhoi Su-22. The Su 22 was promptly shot down by one F-15 while the pilot of the PC-9, upon becoming aware that they were being engaged, opted to eject from the aircraft. The F-15 confirmed the pilots’ parachute deployment and survival before flying in formation with the unoccupied PC-9 until it descended and crashed into the ground just under two minutes later.

Between 1991 and 1996, the United States Army operated three PC-9s as chase and test aircraft. These were eventually sold to Slovenia in 1995.

During the 1990s, Pilatus started production of the improved PC-9M. In 1997, Croatia bought 17 aircraft while neighbouring Slovenia also placed an order for nine (nicknamed Hudournik – "Swift") in December of that same year. During January 1999, Oman ordered 12 examples; four years later, Ireland also signed a contract for eight aircraft. In 2004, Bulgaria purchased 12 PC-9Ms. Mexico took delivery of at least two aircraft in September 2006. Fulfilment of the variant's final order, placed by Ireland for a single attrition replacement aircraft, took place in 2017.

Various operators have flown PC-9s in dedicated formation aerobatic display teams. For a time, it was used by the Roulettes of the Royal Australian Air Force (RAAF). During 2012, the Royal Thai Air Force created the Blue Phoenix aerobatics team; it performs aerial displays using up to five PC-9s, which have a distinctive blue, white and red paint scheme and furnished with white smoke generators.

During 2008, Chad's operation of the PC-9 became politically controversial when the type was allegedly used to attack dissidents, which was considered to be a breach of Swiss export controls.

In August 2015, Pilatus received a contract to deliver nine PC-9Ms to the Royal Jordanian Air Force, however, during April 2016, this order was changed to eight Pilatus PC-21s instead. Deliveries were due to start in January 2017 under the original deal. The PC-21 is a newer and more capable trainer that had effectively succeeded the PC-9 during the 2010s. On 6 December 2019, the final batch of RAAF to fly the PC-9s graduated, the type having been supplanted by recently procured PC-21s.

== Variants ==
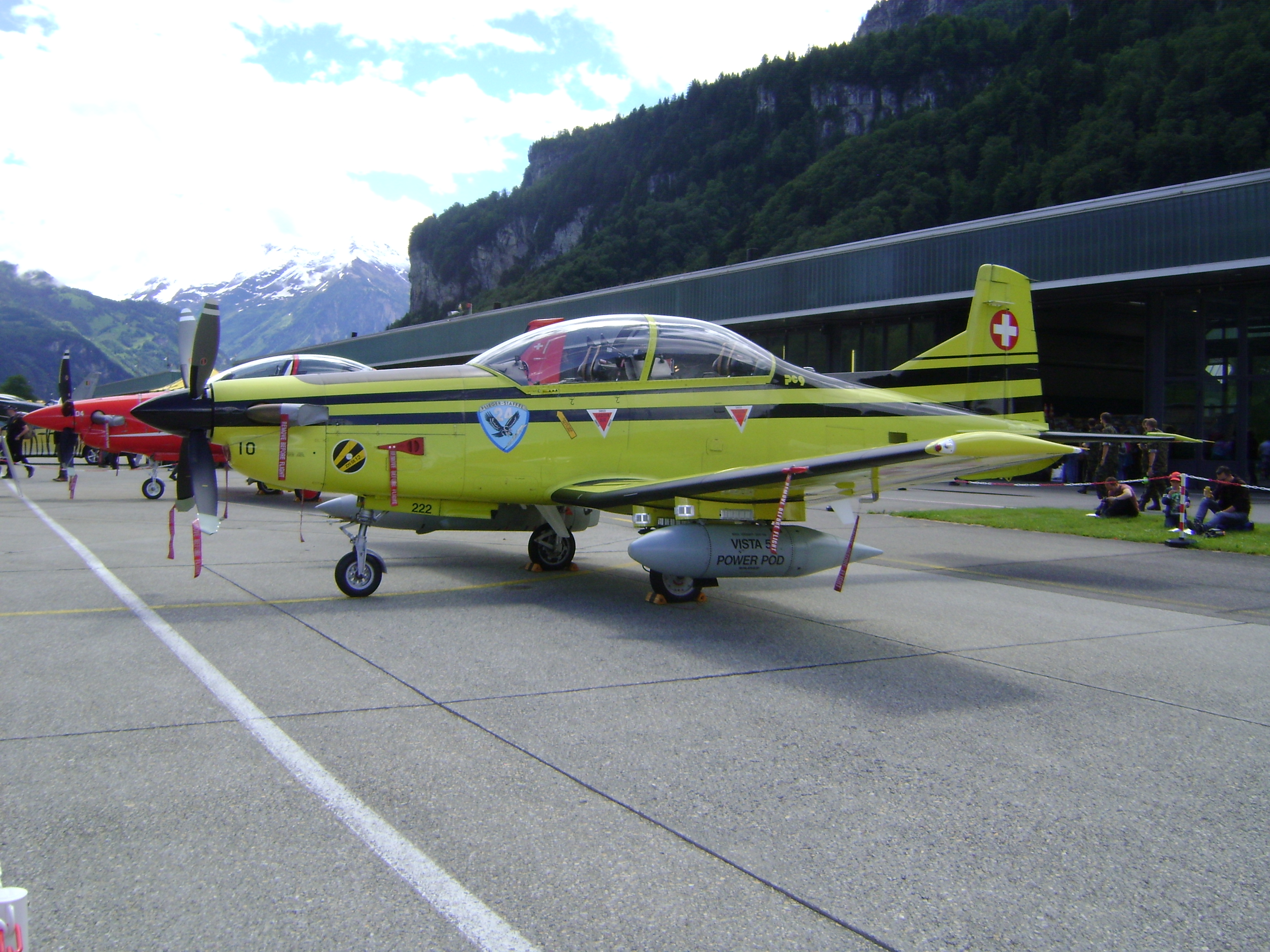
Swiss Air Force PC-9 with Vista 5 Jammer

PC-9
Two-seat basic trainer aircraft.
PC-9/A
67 two-seat trainers for the Royal Australian Air Force. Two fully built planes supplied by Pilatus, 17 assembled from kits and 48 built under licence in Australia by Hawker de Havilland.
PC-9B
Two-seat target-towing aircraft for the German Air Force. This target-towing version has an increased fuel capacity enabling flight for up to three hours and 20 minutes as well as two Southwest RM-24 winches under the wings. These winches can reel out a target up to 3.5 kilometres.
PC-9M
This version was introduced in 1997 as the new standard model. It has an enlarged dorsal fin in order to improve longitudinal stability, modified wingroot fairings, stall strips on the leading edges as well as new engine and propeller controls.
Beech Pilatus PC-9 Mk.2
In order to compete in the United States JPATS competition, Pilatus and Beechcraft jointly developed an extensively modified version of the PC-9, initially referred to the Beech Pilatus PC-9 Mk. II which won out over seven other contenders. It was later renamed the Beechcraft T-6A Texan II and is presently built and marketed independently by Beechcraft while Pilatus receives royalties.
B.F.19
(Thai: บ.ฝ.๑๙) Royal Thai Armed Forces designation for the PC-9.

== Operators ==
=== Military operators ===
Angola

- National Air Force of Angola

Bulgaria

- Bulgarian Air Force

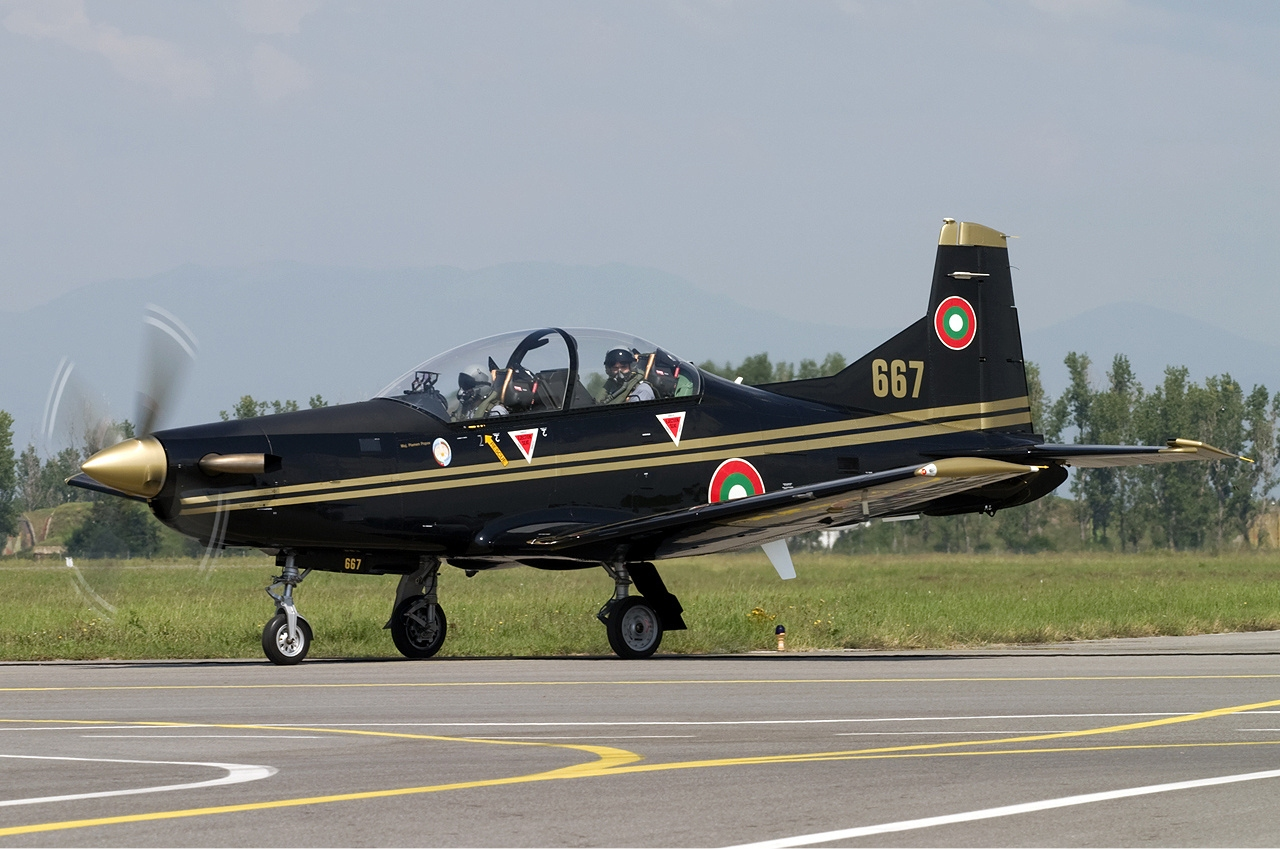
Bulgarian Air Force Pilatus PC-9M

Chad

- Chadian Air Force

Croatia

- Croatian Air Force

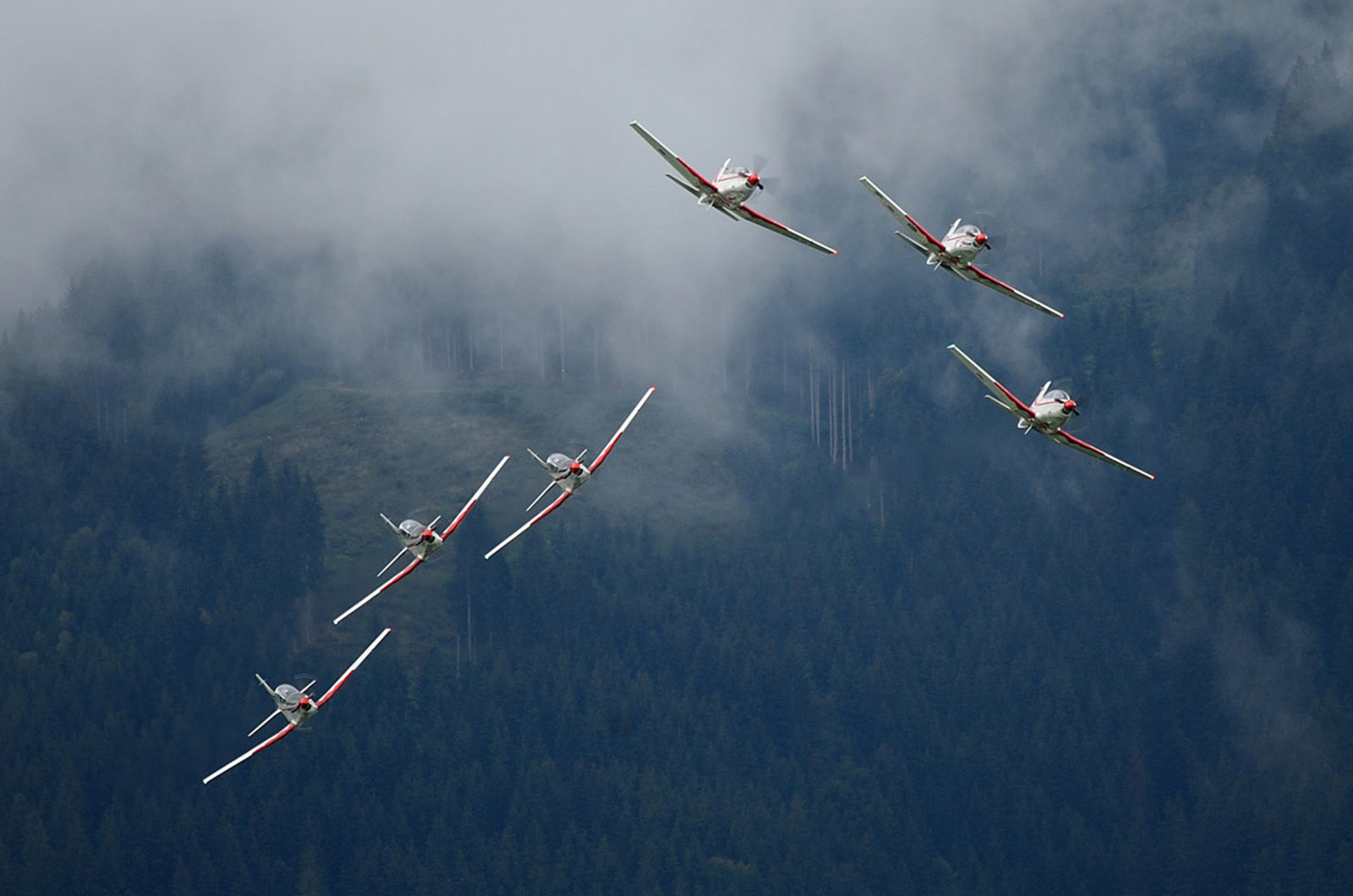
Croatian Air Force aerobatic team Wings of Storm

Cyprus

- Cyprus Air Command

Ireland

- Irish Air Corps

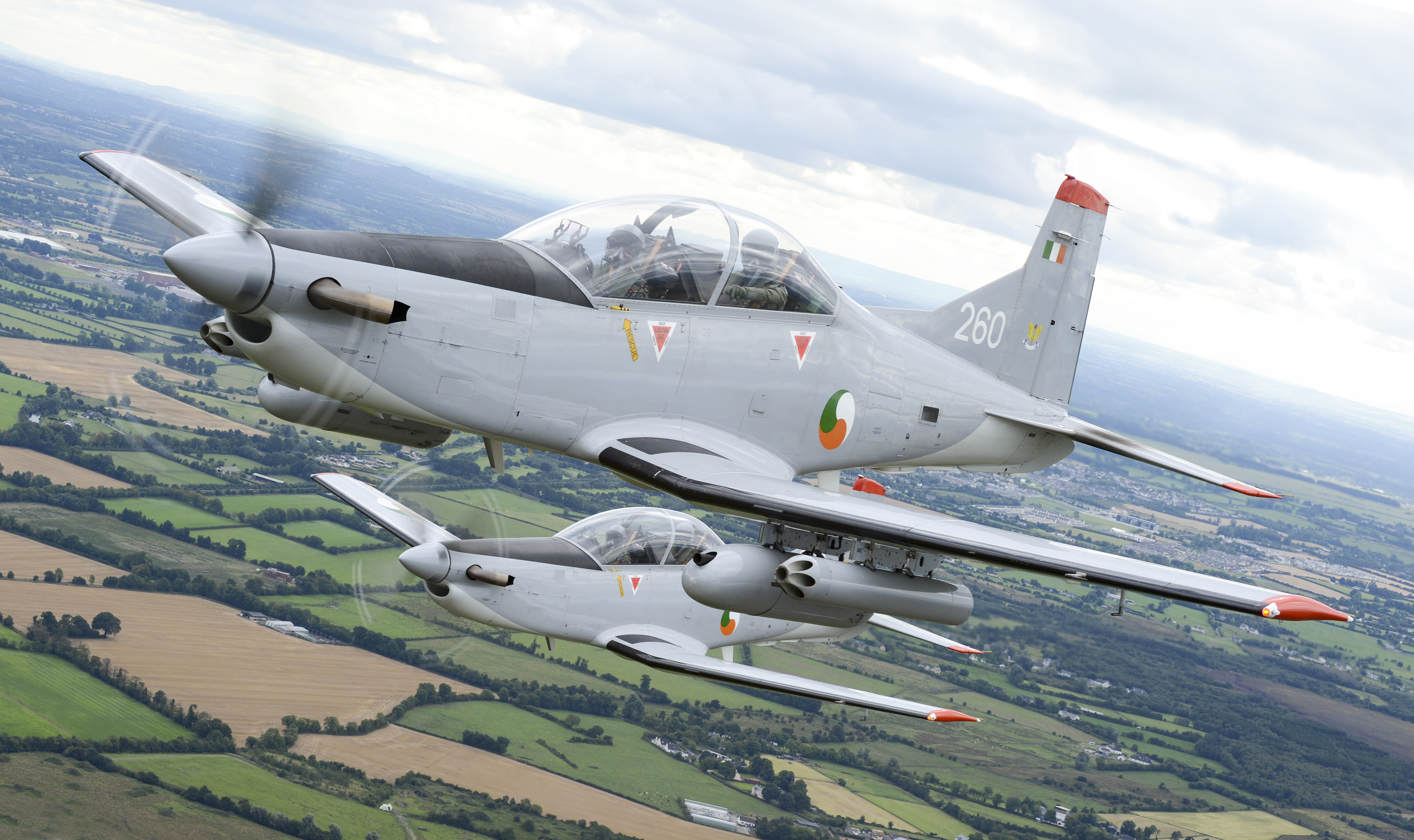
Pilatus PC-9s of the Irish Air Corps flying in formation

Mexico

- Mexican Air Force

Myanmar

- Myanmar Air Force

Oman

- Royal Air Force of Oman

Saudi Arabia

- Royal Saudi Air Force

Slovenia

- Slovenian Air Force and Air Defence

Switzerland

- Swiss Air Force

=== Former military operators ===
Australia

- Royal Australian Air Force – retired in 2019 and replaced by the Pilatus PC-21.

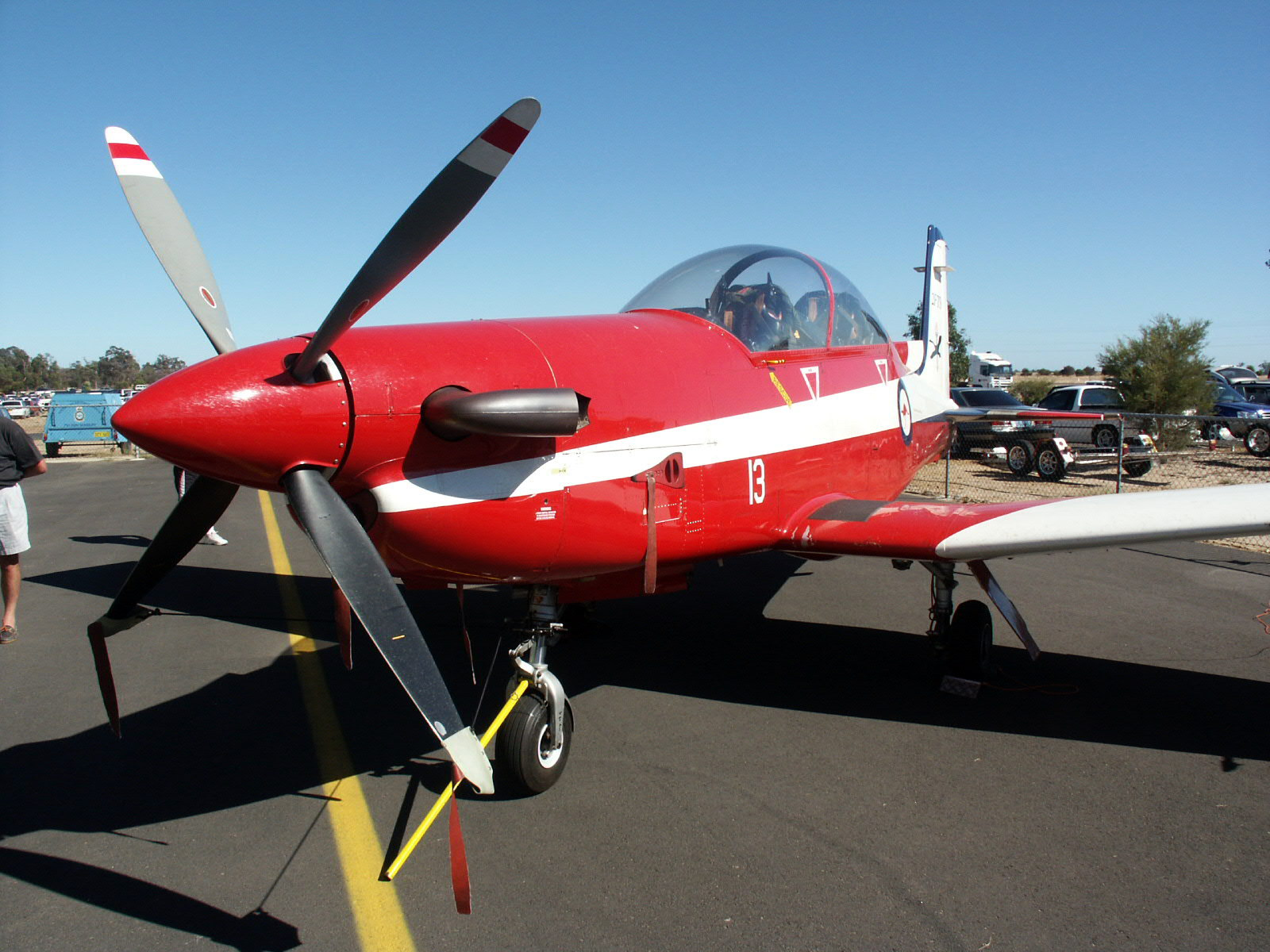
RAAF PC-9/A operated by 2FTS

Iraq

- Iraqi Air Force

Thailand

- Royal Thai Air Force – retired in February 2024 and replaced by the Beechcraft T-6 Texan II.

United States

- United States Army

== Aircraft on display ==
Australia

- A23-001 – RAAF Museum, RAAF Base Point Cook
- A23-009 – gate guardian at RAAF Base Pearce
- A23-020 – Fighter World, RAAF Base Williamtown
- A23-022 – RAAF Base Townsville Aviation Heritage Centre
- A23-028 – Fleet Air Arm Museum, HMAS Albatross
- A23-030 – gate guardian at RAAF Base East Sale
- A23-031 – RAAF Wagga Heritage Centre
- A23-032 – RAAF Wagga Heritage Centre, in storage for eventual display at another location
- A23-036 – gate guardian at RAAF Base East Sale

== Specifications (PC-9M) ==
Data from Jane's All The World's Aircraft 2003–2004

General characteristics

- Crew: one or two pilots
- Length: 10.14 m (33 ft 3 in)
- Wingspan: 10.125 m (33 ft 3 in)
- Height: 3.26 m (10 ft 8 in)
- Wing area: 16.29 m^{2} (175.3 sq ft)
- Empty weight: 1,725 kg (3,803 lb)
- Gross weight: 2,350 kg (5,181 lb)
- Max takeoff weight: 3,200 kg (7,055 lb)
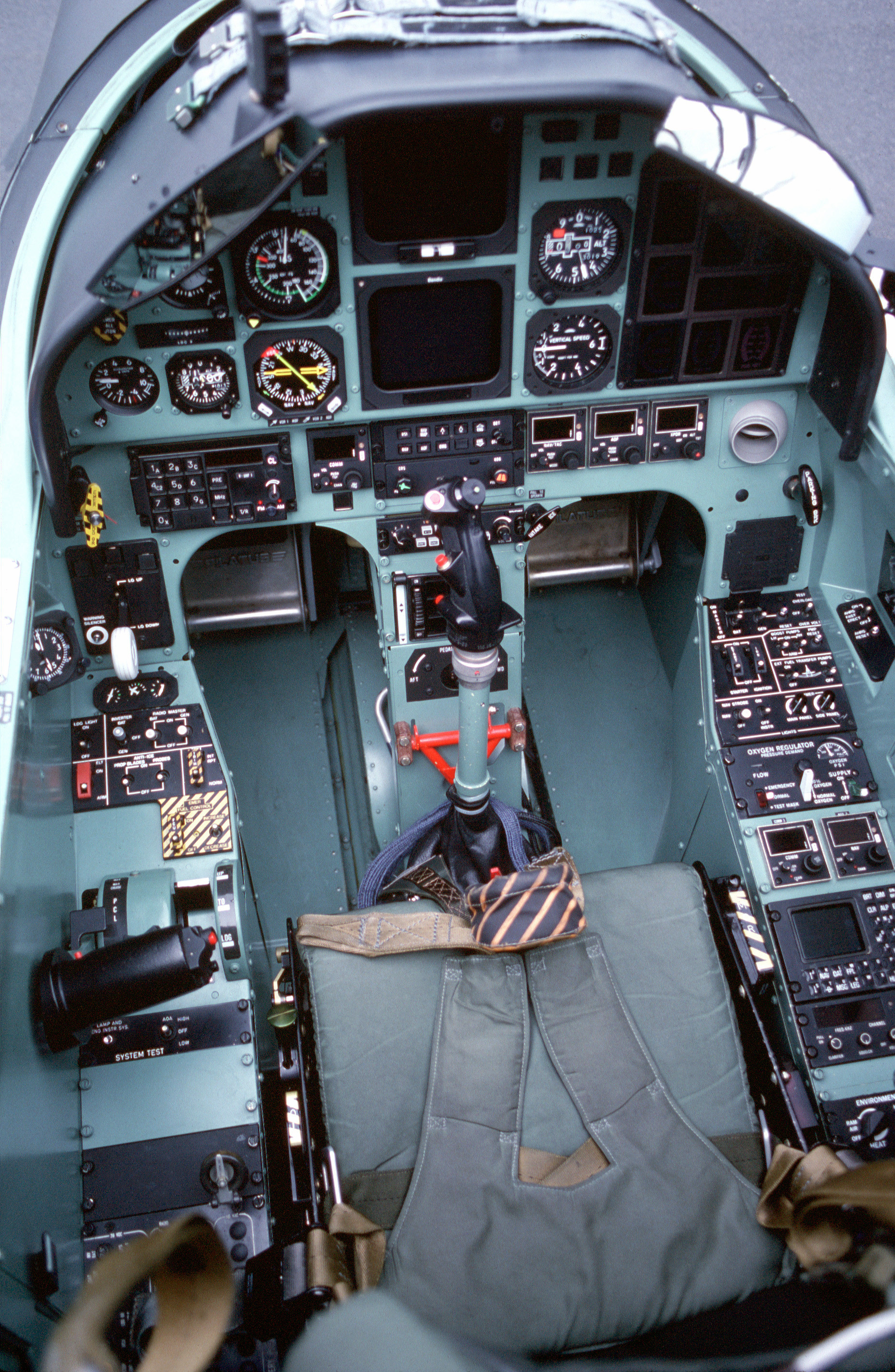
  A view of the interior of the cockpit of a Pilatus PC-9 aircraft.
- Powerplant: 1 × Pratt & Whitney Canada PT6A-62 turboprop, 857 kW (1,149 hp) flat-rated at 708 kW (950 shp)

Performance

- Maximum speed: 593 km/h (368 mph, 320 kn)
- Cruise speed: 556 km/h (345 mph, 300 kn) at 7,620 m (25,000 ft)
- Stall speed: 143 km/h (89 mph, 77 kn) EAS flaps and gear up, 128 km/h (80 mph; 69 kn) flaps and gear down
- Range: 1,537 km (955 mi, 830 nmi)
- Endurance: four hours and 30 minutes
- Service ceiling: 11,580 m (37,990 ft)
- g limits: + 7.0 g to −3.5 g
- Rate of climb: 20.8 m/s (4,090 ft/min)
- Take-off distance over 50 ft (15 m) obstacle at sea level: 1,280 ft (391 m)
- Landing distance over 50 ft (15 m) obstacle at sea level: 2,295 ft (700 m)

Armament

- Hardpoints: seven hardpoints, 3 under each wing, inner two rated at 250 kg (550 lb), outer rated at 110 kg (240 lb)

== See also ==
- Blue Phoenix

Related development

- Beechcraft T-6 Texan II
- Pilatus PC-7
- Pilatus PC-21

Aircraft of comparable role, configuration, and era

- Embraer EMB 312 Tucano
- Embraer EMB 314 Super Tucano
- Grob G 120TP
- KAI KT-1
- PZL-130 Orlik
