= Croatian Air Force =

Air warfare branch of Croatia's military

- Hrvatsko ratno zrakoplovstvo
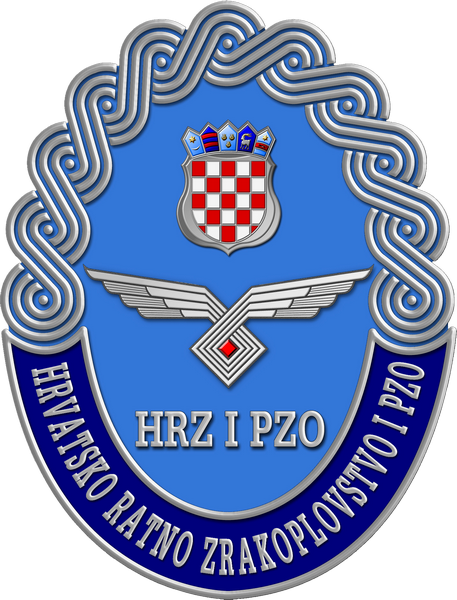
- Emblem of the Croatian Air Force
- Founded: 12 December 1991; 34 years ago
- Country: Croatia
- Type: Air force
- Role: Aerial warfare
- Size: 1,500
- Part of: Croatian Armed Forces
- H/Q: Pleso Air Base
- Mottos: "They Watch and Sail the Croatian Sky"
- Anniversaries: 12 December
- Engagements: List: Croatian War of Independence: Siege of Dubrovnik; Operation Maslenica; Operation Winter '94; Operation Flash; Operation Storm Bosnian War: Operation Mistral 2 War on Terror: War in Afghanistan; Iraq War
- Website: vojnipilot.hr

Commanders
- Current commander: Brigadier Krešimir Ražov
- Notable commanders: General Imra Agotić, Brigadier General Rudolf Perešin

Insignia
- Roundel

- Fin flash

- Flag

Aircraft flown
- Attack: Bayraktar TB2
- Fighter: Rafale B/C
- Attack helicopter: OH-58D, Mi-171Sh
- Utility helicopter: Bell 206B, UH-60M
- Trainer: Z 242L, PC-9M
- Transport: CL-415, AT-802A/F

The Croatian Air Force (Croatian: Hrvatsko ratno zrakoplovstvo or HRZ) is the aerial warfare branch of the Armed Forces of Croatia. It is headquartered on the Pleso Air Base in Zagreb, Croatia with coastal airfields in Zadar and Split. The Air Force is tasked primarily with commanding and protecting Croatian airspace. Along with conducting independent air operations, it provides air support for land and naval forces and aids in the recovery of troops in the field.

Its strategic mandate is articulated as air supremacy, reconnaissance, rapid mobility, air strike capability, as well as command and control. It is the second-youngest service branch and third-largest following the Croatian Navy and Croatian Army. This service branch oversees the nation's autonomous combat and surveillance drone fleet. It supports and participates in NATO, UN, EU, and American-led military operations around the world.

== History ==
=== Formation and Croatian War of Independence ===
The Croatian Air Force was established on 12 December 1991 during the Croatian War of Independence. The cornerstone of the Croatian Air Force was the establishment of an aviation group at the Command of the National Guard Corps (ZNG).

On 17 October 1990, an air combat group was formed at the Sinj airport on Piket as the nucleus of the future Croatian Air Force. The most important was the independent air platoon Osijek, founded on 8 October 1991 by one of the "fathers" of the Croatian Air Force Marko Živković, who was killed in action on 2 December 1991 with the rest of the aircraft crew. The Independent Air Platoon Osijek supplied weapons and medical supplies to the defenders of Vukovar and carried out attacks on enemy positions during the battle of Vukovar with improvised boiler bombs. As the war progressed, MiG-21 fighter jets, Mi-24 combat helicopters, Mi-8 and Mi-17 transport helicopters became part of the Croatian Air Force. In late 1993 and early 1994, 40 MIG-21 aircraft produced between 1972 and 1980 were acquired from the former Central Asian republics of the USSR, of which 24 were included in the squadrons and 16 were used as spare parts supplies. In mid-1993, 15 Mil Mi-24 fighter helicopters were acquired.

Towards the end of the war, airspace protection actions, assault operations and landings of infantry units were carried out. Croatian MiG-21s were used for reconnaissance, air superiority missions, and close air support operations, despite limited resources and spare parts. In total, Croatian forces downed more than forty enemy aircraft and lost three MiG-21 to enemy fire. Croatia ordered ten Bell 206B-3, worth $15 million with training and support, for initial-entry helicopter pilot training in its air force in 1996. In 2005, government retired a squadron of seven Mi-24V helicopters due to maintenance costs. Following the 2007 Croatian coastal fires in Kornati, the government acquired two Canadair CL-415 and five Air Tractor AT-802 water bombers for $70 million. Croatia subsequently became the leading aerial firefighting power on the Mediterranean in respect to its population and surface.

=== Modernisation and NATO ===
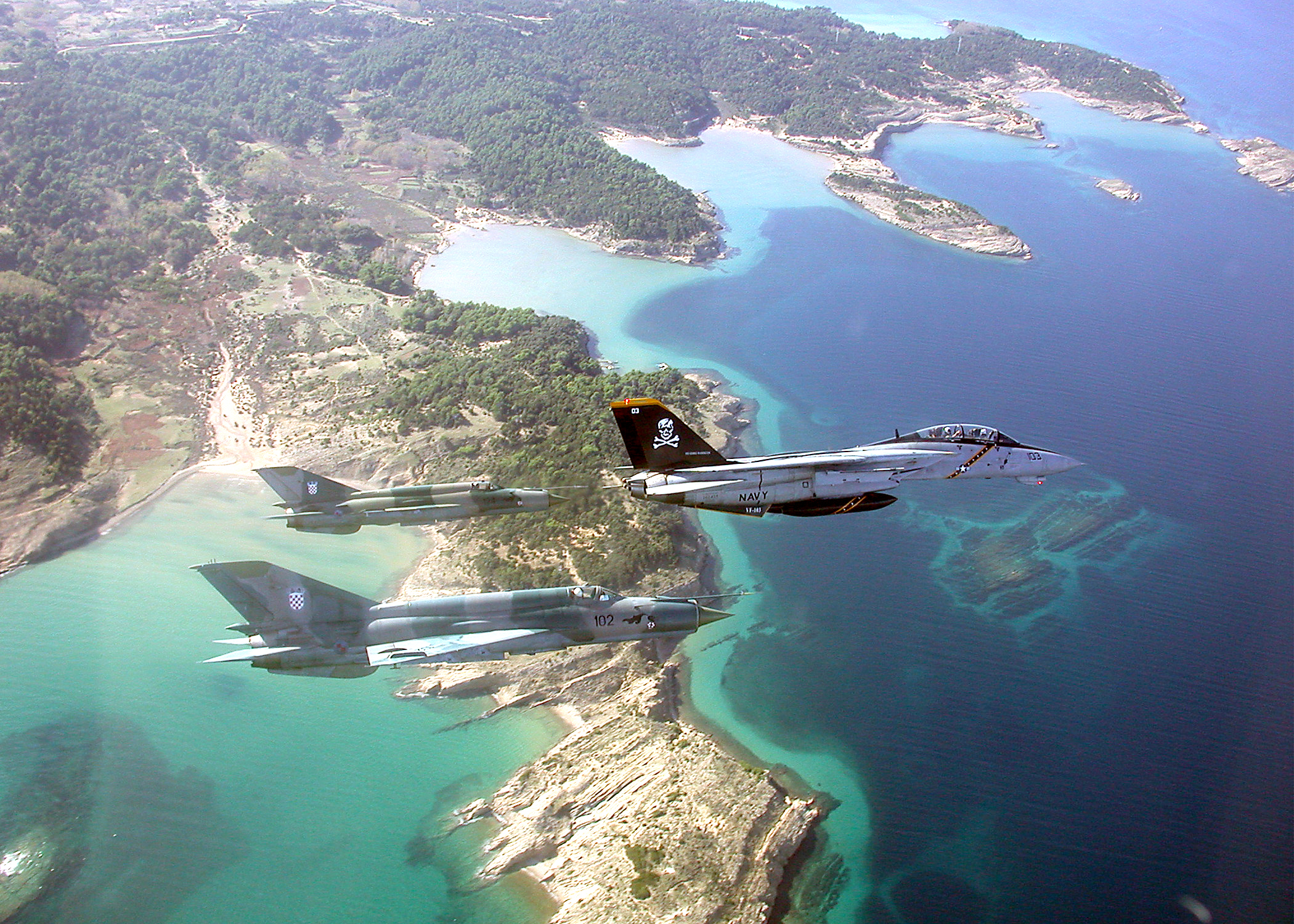
Pair of Croatian MiG-21s and US Navy F-14 over Adriatic Sea.

Since joining the military alliance NATO in 2009, the Croatian Air Force has undergone multiple modernisation programs. With initial plans to replace the MiG-21 fleet with a multirole combat aircraft that year, the 2010s global financial crisis led to strained public finances. Two years later, in 2015, the Air Force acquired sixteen Bell OH-58 Kiowa scout helicopters. During the 2010s, members of the Air Force stationed in Afghanistan trained Afghan helicopter pilots, aviation technicians and flight technicians on the Mi-17 helicopter in Kabul. Croatia received a total of sixteeen OH-58D Kiowa Warrior helicopters from the U.S. Army in 2016 worth $14.5 million.

In 2018, Croatia announced their intention to acquire 12 F-16 Fighting Falcon aircraft from Israel for €410 million in a large-scale arms deal. This deal included two flight simulators, training for its pilots and maintenance staff in Israel, aircraft weapons, a package of spare parts and equipment for ground support and infrastructure construction. Originally sourced from the United States, the American government halted the deal by 2019 citing Israel's refusal to comply with the U.S. arms transfer guidelines.

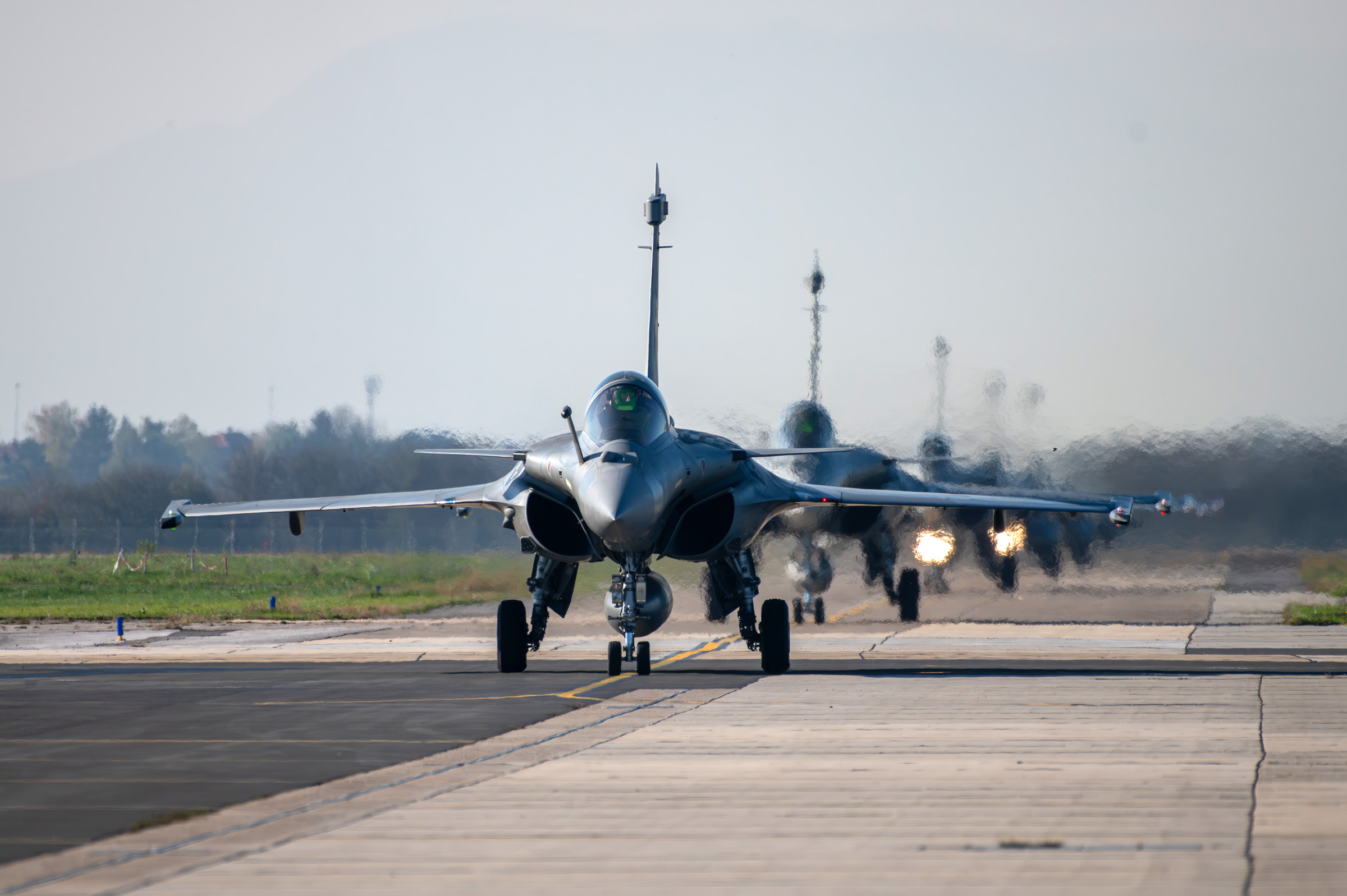
The Croatian Armed Forces modernized their entire combat aircraft fleet in 2025.

Modernisation efforts were restarted in January 2020 amid the COVID-19 pandemic. During a training flight over the Adriatic Sea that year, a Croatian OH-58D helicopter struck the water and two pilots lost their lives. By May 2021, Prime Minister Andrej Plenković announced the acquisition of 12 French Dassault Rafale combat aircraft in a €999 million deal with France. The deal included comprehensive weapon systems, spare parts, logistics and training. During a transition period, the Italian Air Force and Hungarian Air Force protected neighboring Croatian airspace between 2024 and 2026. On 8 December 2025 a Letter of Intent was signed for the further upgrading of 12 Rafale aircraft from the F3-R standard to the enhanced capabilities of the Rafale F4 standard.

Croatia donated 14 helicopters – eleven Mi-8MTV-1, two Mi-8T and one Mi-8PS – to Ukraine as part of Croatian military aid in 2023. A year later, two Antonov An-32B tactical transport planes were donated as well. Croatia secured two DHC-515 fire-fighting planes from Canada as part of an international EU defence initiative worth €105 million in 2024. That year, the U.S. financed a Foreign Military Sale to Croatia valued at $273.8 million. This transaction included an additional eight UH-60M Black Hawk helicopters and related equipment by 2028. A large €95 million arms deal with Turkey in 2024 led to the debut of Croatian Bayraktar TB2 drones by 2025. In 2026, Croatia announced a modernisation of their AN/FPS-117 radar system for €45 million and signed a High Visibility Project agreement to operate Airbus A400M as part of NATO's new multinational airlift fleet.

== Organization ==
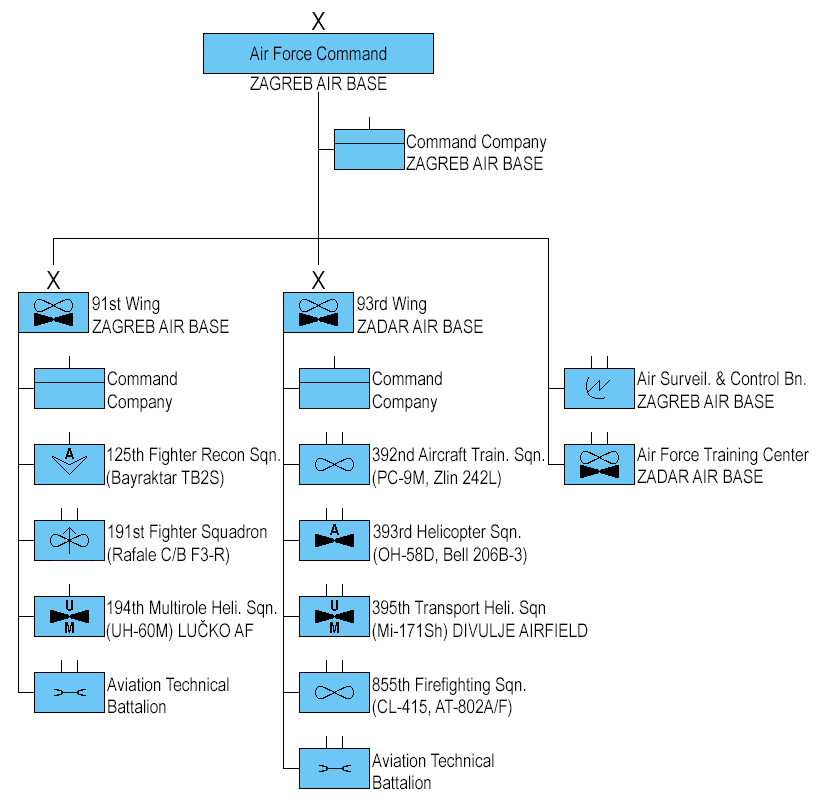
Air Force Command organization as of April 2026 (click image to enlarge)

Commander of the Croatian Air Force

- Air Force and Air Defence Command
  - 91st Wing, at Zagreb Airport
    - Command Company
    - 125th Fighter Reconnaissance Squadron, flying Baykar Bayraktar TB2S
    - 191st Fighter Aircraft Squadron, flying Dassault Rafale C/B F3-R
    - 194th Multirole Helicopter Squadron, at Lučko Airfield, flying UH-60M Black Hawk
    - Aviation Technical Battalion
  - 93rd Wing, at Zadar Airport
    - Command Company
    - 395th Transport Helicopter Squadron, at Divulje Airfield, flying Mi-171Sh
    - 392nd Aircraft Training Squadron, flying PC-9M and Zlín 242L
    - 855th Firefighting Squadron, flying CL-415, AT-802A/F
    - 393rd Combat Helicopter Squadron, flying OH-58D and Bell 206B-3
    - Aviation Technical Battalion
  - Air Surveillance and Control Battalion, at Zagreb Airport
    - Airspace Surveillance and Control Center, in Podvornica, reports to NATO's Integrated Air Defence System CAOC Torrejón in Spain
    - Sector Operations Center, in Split to coordinate with the Croatian Coast Guard
    - Mount Sljeme, Borinci, Papuk, Učka and Mount Rota radar posts with AN/FPS-117 radars
    - Radio-technical Maintenance and Support Company, at Zagreb Airport
  - Air Force Training Center "Rudolf Perešin", at Zadar Airport

== Aircraft inventory ==
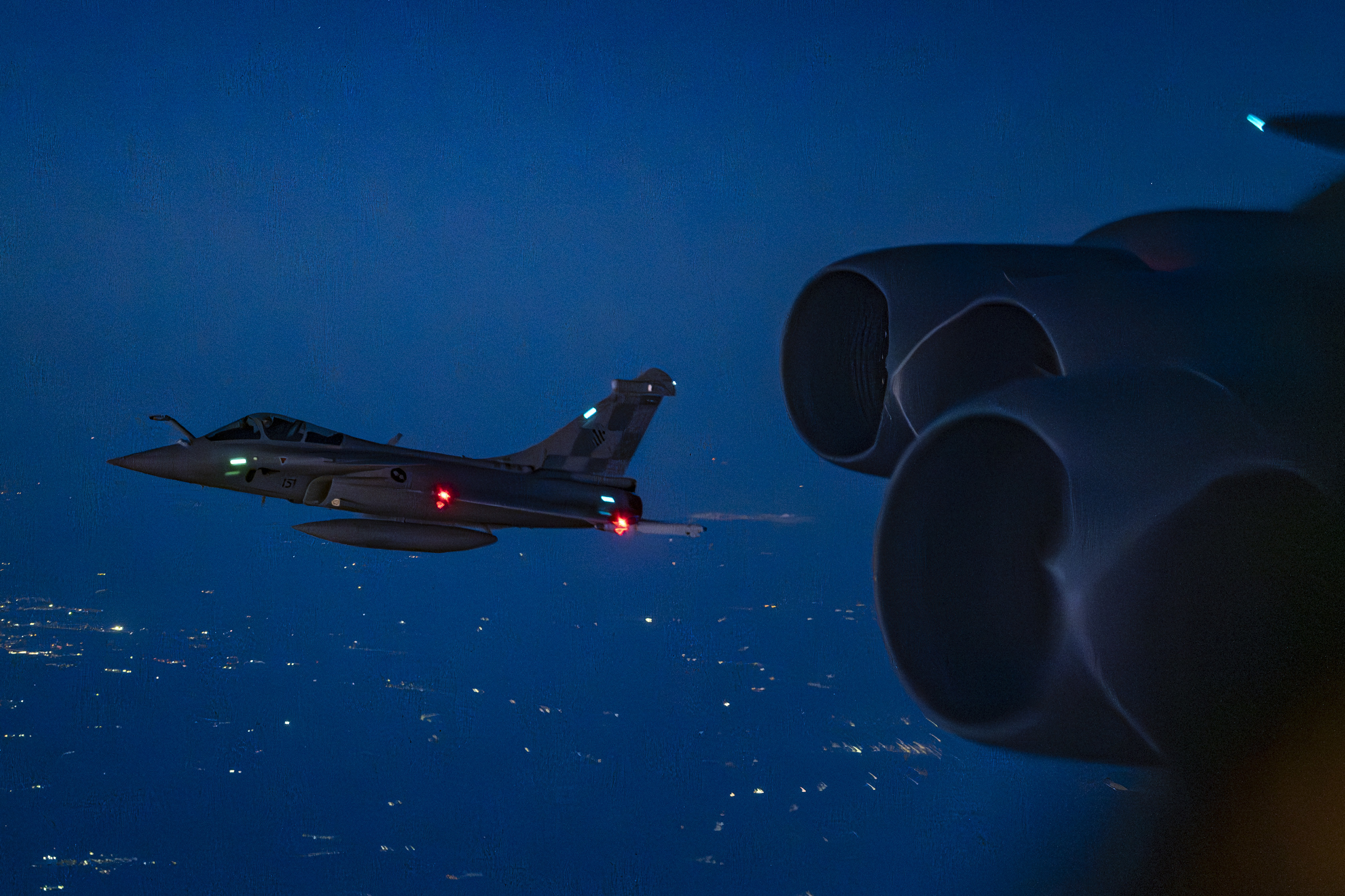
Dassault Rafale F-3R escorting a U.S. Boeing B-52 Stratofortress

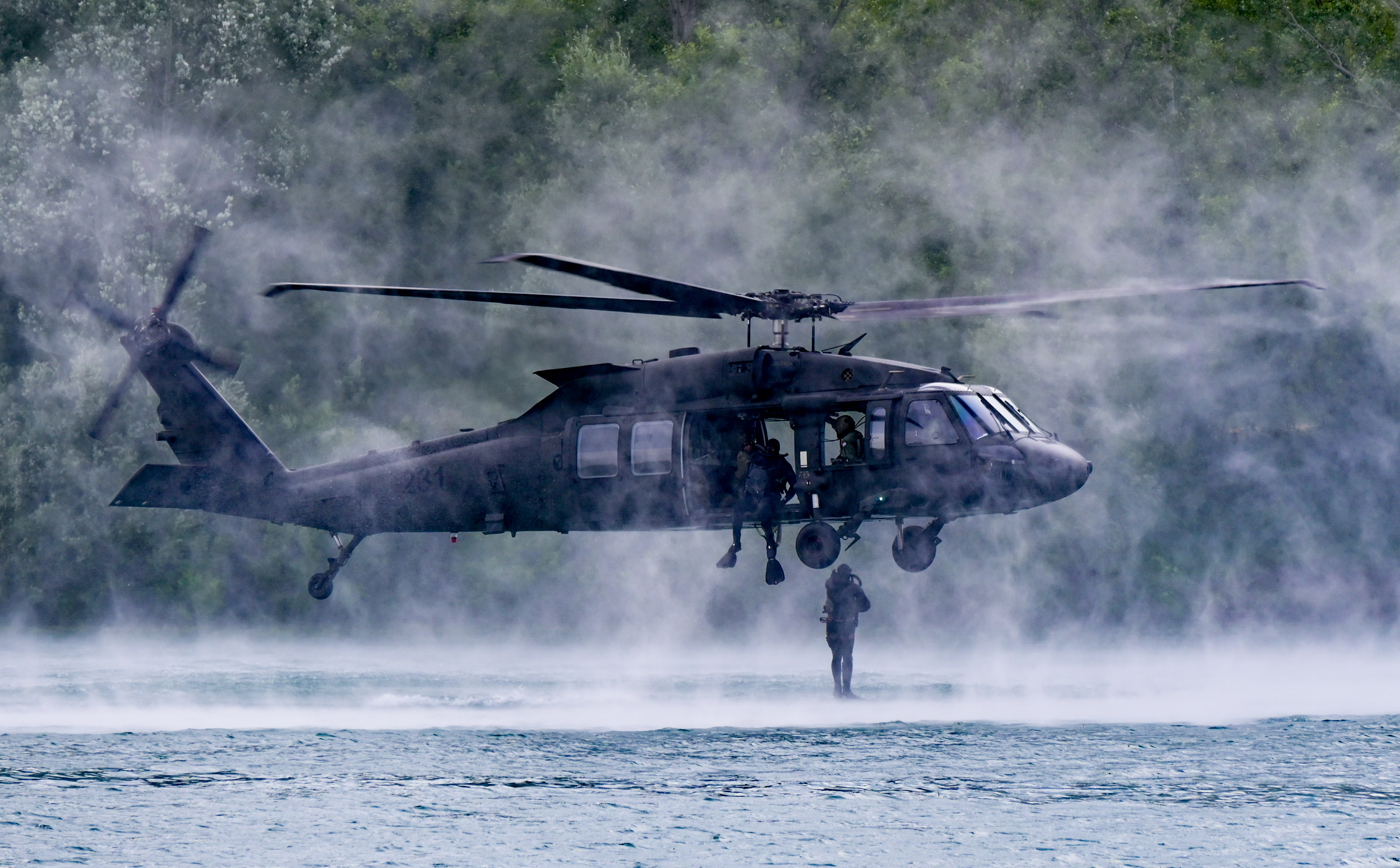
Sikorsky UH-60M Black Hawk over Lake Jarun

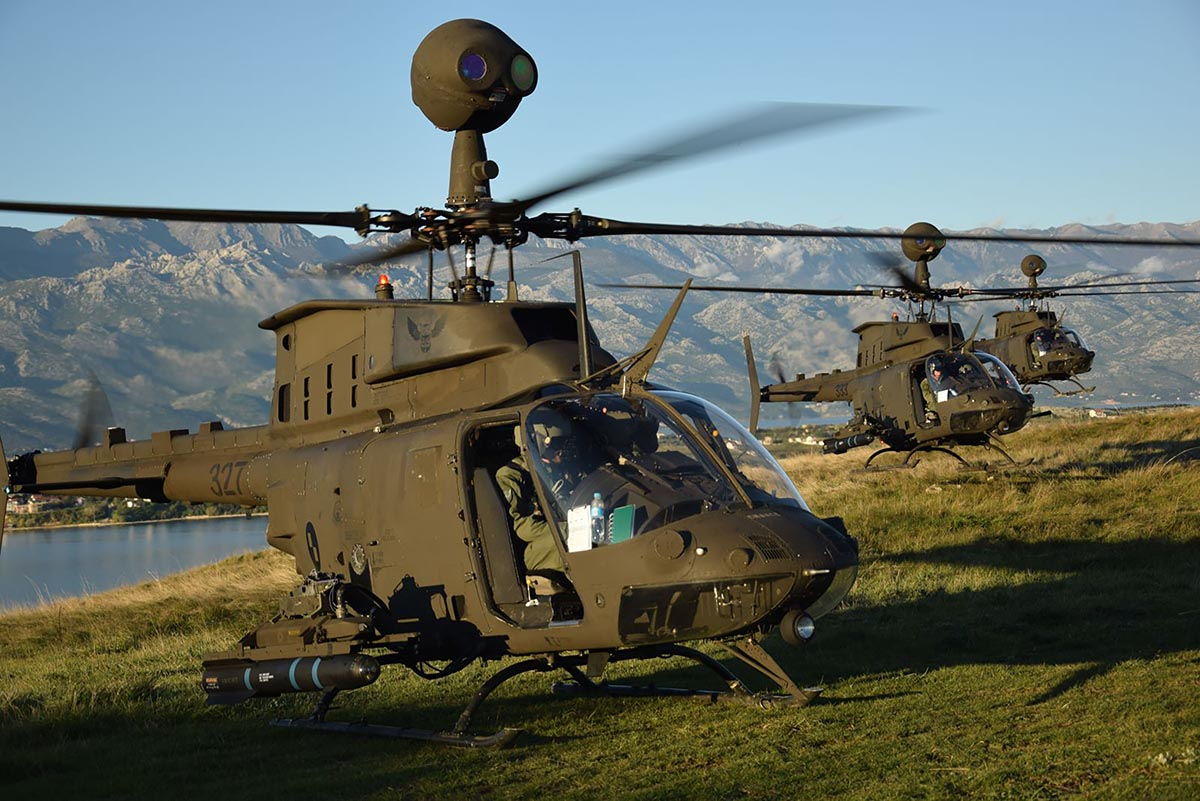
Bell OH-58D Kiowa Warriors.

=== Aircraft ===
Aircraft	Origin	Type	Variant	In service	Notes
Combat aircraft
Dassault Rafale	France	Multirole	F3-R, C	10	To be gradually upgraded to F4 standard between 2027 and 2032.
Dassault Rafale	France	Multirole	F3-R, B	2	To be gradually upgraded to F4 standard between 2027 and 2032.
Trainer aircraft
Zlín Z 42	Czech Republic	Ab initio trainer	Z 242L	4	Five received, one lost.
Pilatus PC-9	Switzerland	Basic trainer (reconnaissance and CAS)	PC-9M	14	Three received second-hand in 1996, and seventeen new in 1997. Six sold and fourteen remain in use.
Aerial firefighting
Air Tractor AT-802	United States	Fire suppressor	AT-802A	5	Seven received, one lost.
Air Tractor AT-802	United States	Fire suppressor	AT-802F	1	Seven received, one lost.
Canadair CL-415	Canada	Water bomber	CL-415	6	
Canadair CL-415	Canada	Water bomber	DHC-515	0	Two on order
Unmanned aerial vehicle
Bayraktar TB2	Turkey	UCAV	TB2S	6	Combat drone fleet
Orqa Interceptor	Croatia	UAIV	MRM-2	Classified	FPV-enabled drones

=== Helicopters ===
Aircraft	Origin	Type	Variant	In service	Notes
Multirole
Mil Mi-17	Russia	Transport / utility / armed capable	Mi-171Sh	10	Received new in 2007 and 2008.
Scout and combat
Bell OH-58	United States	Armed scout	OH-58D(R)	15	Sixteen received, one lost.
Utility
Sikorsky UH-60	United States	Utility	UH-60M	4	Eight more on order.
Trainer helicopters
Bell 206	United States	Rotorcraft trainer	206B-3	8	Ten received, two lost.

== Weapons ==
Aircraft	Origin	Type	Variant	In service	Notes
Weapons of the Dassault Rafale
GIAT 30	France	Cannon (30×150mm B calibre)	GIAT 30M 791	12	
MBDA MICA	France	Air-to-air missile (radar guidance)	MICA RF/EM	–	
MBDA MICA	France	Air-to-air missile (infrared guidance)	MICA IR	–	
MBDA Meteor	European countries (United Kingdom. Germany, France, Italy, Spain, Sweden)	BVR air-to-air missile	–	–	
MBDA SCALP-EG	France, United Kingdom	Cruise missile	–	–	
Safran AASM Hammer	France	Glide guided bomb	–	–	
GBU-12 Paweway II	United States	Laser-guided bomb	–	–	
Weapons of the Bayraktar TB2
Tübitak Sage BOZOK	Turkey	Air-to-surface missile	–	–	
Roketsan MAM	Turkey	Air-to-surface missile	–	–	
Weapons of the OH-58D
M2 Browning	United States	Heavy machine gun	M296	–	
Hydra 70	United States	Rockets	–	–	
AGM-114 Hellfire-2	United States	Air-to-surface missile	M36, R	100	
Weapons of the Mi-171Sh
Zastava M84	Yugoslavia	General-purpose machine gun	–	–	
S-8	Russia	Rockets	–	–	
Weapons of the UH-60M
M240	United States	Machine gun (7.62mm)	_	_	

== Radars ==
Model	Variant	Origin	Type	In service	Notes
Air surveillance
AN/FPS-117	–	United States	L-band, AESA, 3D air search radar	5	
Saab Giraffe	Giraffe 40	Sweden	PESA, short-range air defence radar	5	

== Retired aircraft ==
Extended list of retired aircraft

The Croatian Air Force has previously operated the following aircraft since formation: MiG-21, An-32, CL-215, An-2, UTVA 75, Mi-24, Mi-8, and MD 500.

== Personnel ==
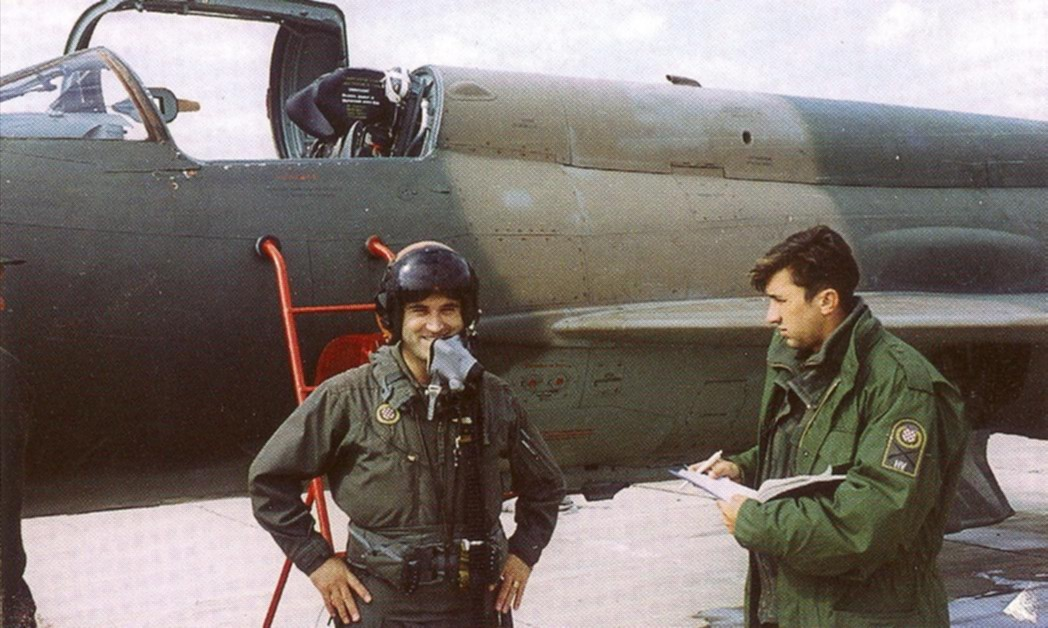
Rudolf Perešin, the first Yugoslav Air Force pilot to defect to the Croatian Air Force.

The Croatian Air Force has had 1,500 members since 2026. It maintains over 200 pilots. Approximately 13.44% of service members are women.

=== Ranks ===
==== Commissioned officers ====
The rank insignia of commissioned officers.

NATO code	OF-10	OF-9	OF-8	OF-7	OF-6	OF-5	OF-4	OF-3	OF-2	OF-1
Croatian Air Force
Croatian Air Force	Stožerni general	General zbora	General pukovnik	General bojnik	Brigadni general	Brigadir	Pukovnik	Bojnik	Satnik	Natporučnik	Poručnik

=== Enlisted personnel ===
The rank insignia of non-commissioned officers and enlisted personnel.

NATO code	OR-9	OR-8	OR-7	OR-6	OR-5	OR-4	OR-3	OR-2	OR-1
Croatian Air Force									No insignia
Croatian Air Force	Časnički namjesnik	Stožerni narednik	Nadnarednik	Narednik	Desetnik	Skupnik	Razvodnik	Pozornik	Vojnik

== See also ==
- Croatian military ranks
- History of Croatian Air Force
- 2022 Zagreb Tu-141 drone crash
- Air Force of the Independent State of Croatia
- Croatian Air Force Legion

== Bibliography ==
- Lisko, T. and Canak, D., Hrvatsko Ratno Zrakoplovstvo u Drugome Svjetskom Ratu (The Croatian Airforce in the Second World War) Zagreb, 1998 ISBN 953-97698-0-9.
- Savic, D. and Ciglic, B. Croatian Aces of World War II Osprey Aircraft of the Aces – 49, Oxford, 2002 ISBN 1-84176-435-3
