= Podvornica =

Coordinates: 45°37′N 16°04′E

- Village
- Interactive map of Podvornica
- Country: Croatia
- County: Zagreb County

Area
  - Total: 0.85 sq mi (2.2 km^{2})

Population (2021)
  - Total: 117
  - Density: 140/sq mi (53/km^{2})
- Time zone: UTC+1 (CET)
  - Summer (DST): UTC+2 (CEST)

Podvornica is a village in Croatia.
