= Pilatus PC-21 =

Single-engine, low-wing tandem-seat turboprop military training aircraft

PC-21
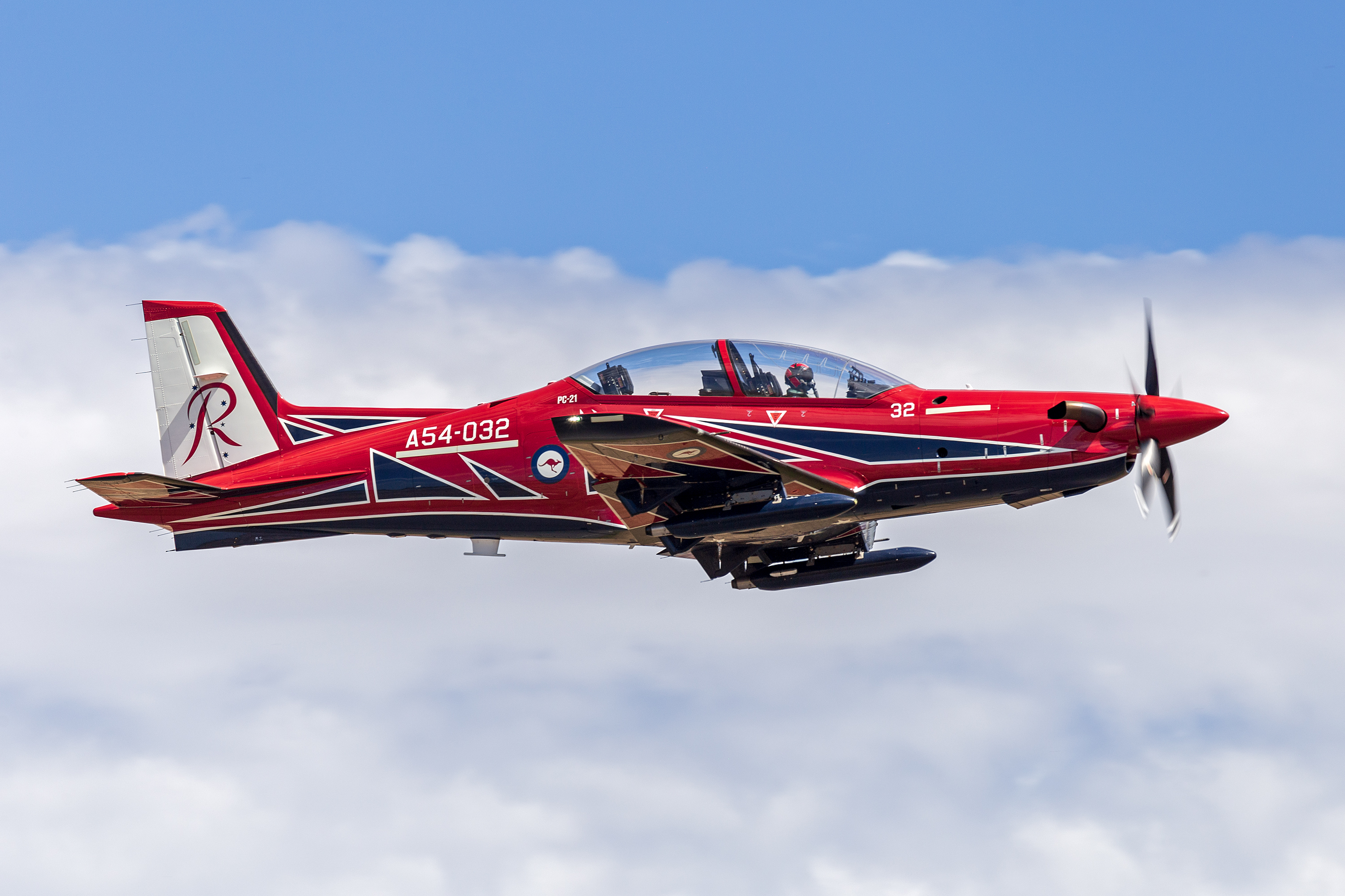
- The PC-21 demonstrator at 2023 Australian International Airshow.

General information
- Type: Advanced trainer aircraft
- Manufacturer: Pilatus Aircraft
- Designer: Pilatus Aircraft
- Status: Active service
- Primary users: Swiss Air Force Royal Australian Air Force; Spanish Air and Space Force; Royal Saudi Air Force; French Air and Space Force
- Number built: 211 (312 ordered in total)

History
- Manufactured: 2002–present
- Introduction date: April 2008
- First flight: 1 July 2002

The Pilatus PC-21 is a turboprop-powered advanced trainer with a stepped tandem cockpit. It is manufactured by Pilatus Aircraft of Switzerland.

== Development ==
In November 1997 Pilatus flew a modified PC-7 Mk.II in order to test improvements for a prospective next generation turboprop trainer. As a result of these tests, Pilatus elected to fund the development of a new training system in November 1998; development of the new trainer, designated as the PC-21, formally started in January 1999. The PC-21 would be developed and certified as a completely new training system, aimed at meeting future military customers' specifications in terms of capability and life-cycle costs for the next three decades.

A key aim for the PC-21 was to allow jet aircraft pilots to perform the majority of their training using the type before converting to jet-powered types, allowing operators to make substantial savings. In order to achieve this aim, the new trainer was required to have an expanded performance envelope in terms of aerodynamics, cockpit equipment, flexibility, and ease of maintenance. In May 2002 Pilatus announced that it aimed for the PC-21 to capture 50% of the global trainer aircraft market between 2005 and 2030.

From the start of the aircraft's development, Pilatus aimed for the type to have a predictable cost profile over its full lifespan. To meet this goal, the firm chose to incorporate modern materials, an innovative design concept, and full-scale fatigue analysis. Additionally, accompanying the aircraft itself are integrated training systems to meet the pilot's needs; the full package offered by Pilatus includes synthetic training devices, computer-based training, and classroom instruction. As a result of greater training effectiveness, pilots can graduate with fewer total training hours, reaching the frontline faster and at lower cost. In addition to pilots, various prospective aircrew, such as navigators, weapons officers, and electronic warfare operators, can be trained using the type's embedded simulation/emulation system.

On 30 April 2002, the rollout of the first PC-21 prototype was performed at Pilatus' factory in Stans, Switzerland; this aircraft conducted its first flight on 1 July of the same year. In May 2003, Pilatus management formally green-lit the program to proceed to full development. On 7 June 2004, a second PC-21 prototype, the construction of which had been delayed to incorporate improvements learnt from assembling the first, made its maiden flight. In December 2004, Switzerland's Federal Office for Civil Aviation granted type certification for the PC-21; civil certification was attained despite it being a military aircraft as this permitted civil maintenance procedures to be used as well as allowing the aircraft to be supplied under private finance arrangements. Individual Swiss military certification for equipment such as ejection seats has been applied as necessary.

On 13 January 2005, the second of the two development aircraft crashed in Buochs, Switzerland, while conducting an aerobatic training flight; the accident resulted in the death of the pilot as well as injuring another person on the ground. In response to the accident, the other PC-21 was grounded for several weeks until Swiss authorities had established that there was no sign of technical malfunction. In August 2006, it was announced that crash investigators had concluded that pilot error had been a primary cause. In late August 2005, the first pre-series production PC-21 performed its maiden flight.

== Design ==
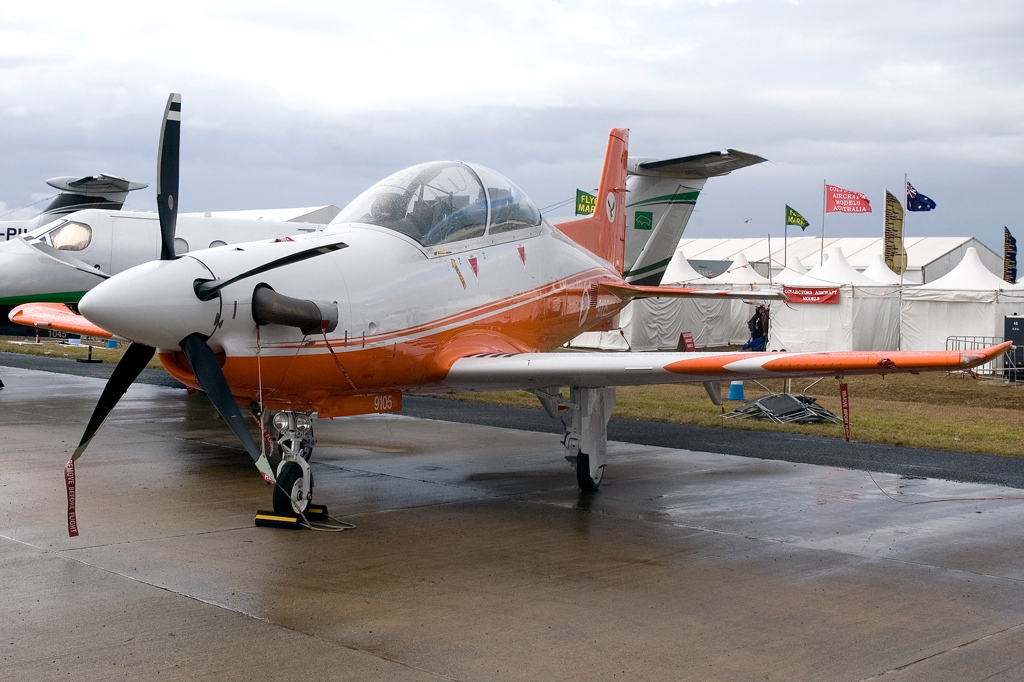
A PC-21 on static display, 2009

The Pilatus PC-21 is an advanced single-engine trainer aircraft; it is often referred to by Pilatus as being the "Twenty-first Century Trainer". The type can be applied for various training capacities, including basic flying training, advanced flight training, full mission management training, and embedded simulation/emulation. In order to perform these functions, the aircraft possesses a powerful, flexible, and cost-effective integrated training system; providing sufficient ease of use for inexperienced pilots while posing greater challenge to advanced pilots. According to Pilatus, upon product launch, the PC-21 possessed "superior aerodynamic performance when compared with any other turboprop trainer on the market".

The aircraft features a tandem-seating arrangement (student in front/instructor behind) in a bird strike-resistant glass canopy with allround vision. The cabin, which is pressurised, is equipped with an On-Board Oxygen Generation System (OBOGS), air conditioning, and Martin-Baker CH16C Zero-Zero ejection seats. The flight controls, which are fully balanced and harmonized, are optimized for ease of operation and overall effectiveness. An anti-g system is also present in order to minimize the effects of high g-forces experienced during tactical training and aerobatic maneuvers. Pilots are able to spend a greater amount of time concentrating on the aircraft's external situation and upon mission data inputs due to an ergonomic design approach, ease-of-use controls, and clear visual/system data displays. In addition, a full autopilot and civil flight management system are also present.

The PC-21 is powered by a single Pratt & Whitney Canada PT6A-68B turboprop engine of 1,600 shaft horse power, which drives a five-bladed graphite scimitar propeller manufactured by Hartzell; it has been claimed by Pilatus that the PC-21 possesses speed and climb rates previously normally performed only by jet-powered aircraft. It is also fitted with a high-speed profile wing, rated for maneuvers up to 8g, complete with hydraulically-assisted ailerons and spoilers which enable the execution of fighter-like rates of roll and other maneuvers. In order to make the aircraft easy to fly at low speeds, crucial to the advanced trainer role, the PC-21 is furnished with a digital power management system and the rudder control system is equipped with an automatic yaw compensator/suppression system to compensate for airspeed and engine power changes.

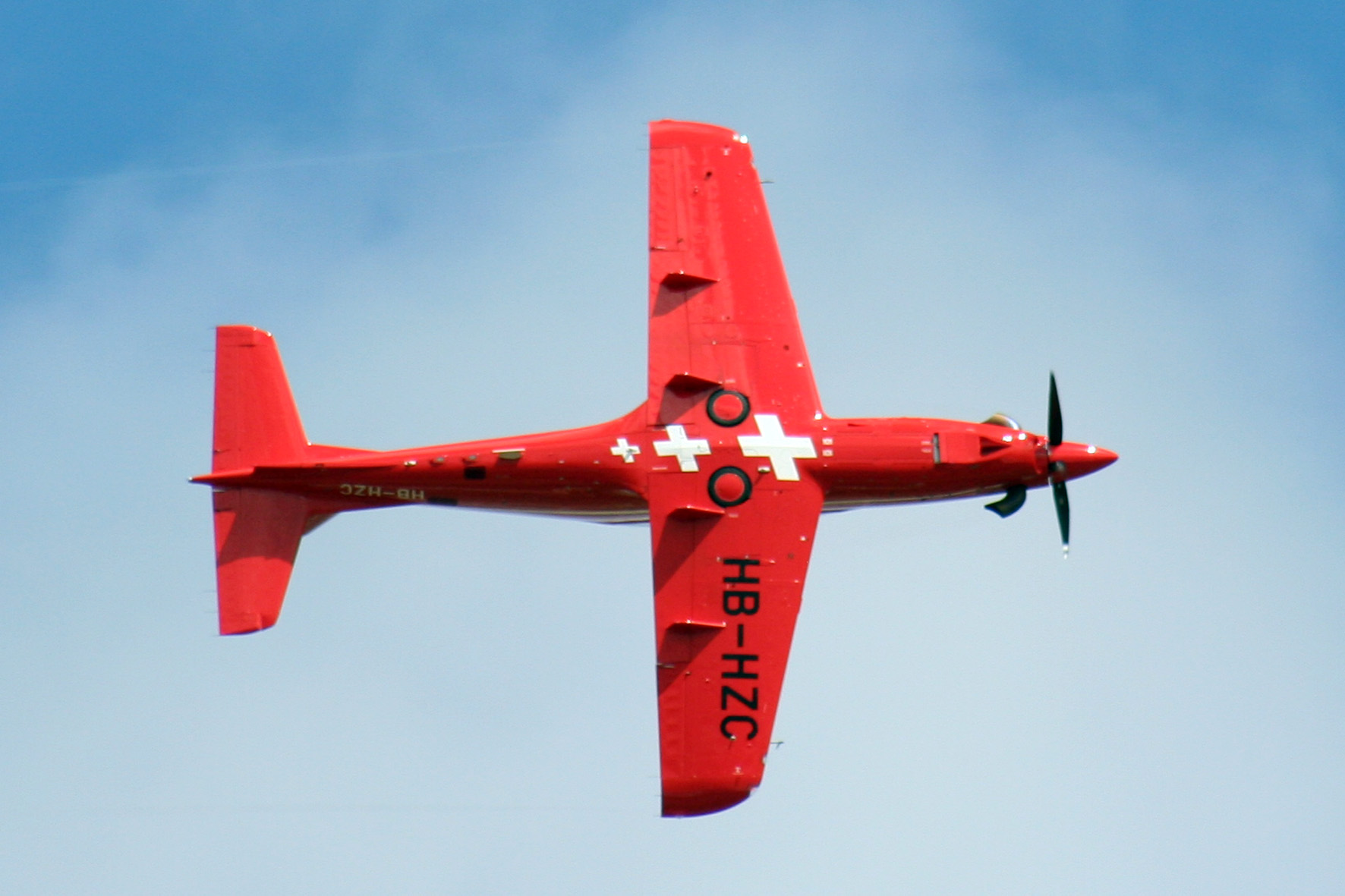
Underside of a PC-21 in flight

A key feature of the PC-21 is the embedded simulation and training suite, which provides cross-platform cockpit emulation, weapons simulation, stores management system, simulated radar and electronic warfare, a tactical situation display, and data link functionality. Key to this is the Mission Support System (MSS), which comprises the Mission Planning System (MPS) and Mission Debriefing System (MDS); data can be loaded and unloaded from these, which is compatible with ground-based stations for pre-flight configuration or post-mission analysis. The integrated mission computer is of an open architecture, allowing for third-party modifications and upgrades to take place; software can also be customised to conform to customer preferences. Critical and non-critical software are also deliberately separated.

The cockpit of the PC-21 features a high level of systems integration and conforms to modern avionics standards. The systems of the forward and rear cockpits can be 'de-coupled' between the student and instructor; the instructor may exercise real-time manipulation of the student's displays, sensor performance, and system modes such as to create synthetic air-to-air radar targets, artificial non-safety critical system failures, and controlled data degradation. The aircraft's fully digital glass cockpit features three large colour liquid crystal displays (LCD), one performing as the primary flight display (PFD) and two multi-function displays (MFDs) for system/mission management, in addition to CMC Electronics-provided head-up displays (HUD) for both the pilot and instructor. The trim gauge is the only analogue dial in the cockpit. For control simplicity, a Hands on Throttle and Stick (HOTAS) control philosophy has been followed. Both the display and control systems present also resemble their counterparts used upon modern front-line combat aircraft for greater realism during training; and can be further customised in order to be more representative of specific combat aircraft. The multi-sensor navigation system is capable of operating under a military tactical mode as well as a civil navigation mode.

== Operational history ==
=== Australia ===
The PC-21 was one of the submissions for the Royal Australian Air Force's project AIR 5428, which sought a replacement of its Pilatus PC-9s; in September 2015, it was announced that the consortium comprising Lockheed Martin, Pilatus and Hawker Pacific ("Team 21"), had won the bid to provide 49 PC-21s to the Australian Defence Force.

=== France ===
In January 2017, Pilatus received a contract for 17 PC-21s by the French Department of Defense as a new training aircraft. On 31 August 2018, France's defence procurement agency Direction générale de l'armement announced the arrival of the first two PC-21s. The delivery of the remaining aircraft is scheduled to be completed in 2019.

In 2024, the PC-21 was used by the French Air Force as a surveillance aircraft during the 2024 Paris Olympics Game.

=== Jordan ===
In August 2015, Pilatus received a contract to deliver nine PC-9Ms to the Royal Jordanian Air Force, but in April 2016 changed the order to eight PC-21s. Deliveries were due to start in January 2017 under the original deal.

=== Qatar ===
In July 2012, it was announced that the Qatar Air Force had placed an order for a complete pilot training system from Pilatus centering upon the PC-21. The package included ground-based training devices, logistical support and maintenance in addition to 24 PC-21 aircraft. On 1 October 2014, the Qatar Air Force formally received its first batch of PC-21 trainers.

=== Saudi Arabia ===
On 23 May 2012, Saudi Arabia signed a £1.6 billion ($2.5 billion) contract for a comprehensive next-generation military pilot training system, comprising 22 BAE Systems Hawk advanced jet trainers in addition to 55 PC-21 trainers. In early June 2014, Pilatus commenced delivery of the first six PC-21s to Saudi Arabia; by the end of 2015, this had risen to 46 PC-21s delivered.

=== Singapore ===
In November 2006, the Republic of Singapore Air Force (RSAF) awarded a service contract to Lockheed Martin Simulation, Training and Support (LMSTS) to deliver 19 PC-21 aircraft, to support the RSAF's Basic Wings training course at RAAF Base Pearce in Australia under a public–private partnership (PPP) arrangement, replacing the SIAI-Marchetti S.211. Singapore was the first export customer for the PC-21. On 21 January 2008, the first RSAF PC-21 completed its flight test prior to being accepted into service. On 13 July 2008, the type began to provide the RSAF with basic flying training, by which point a further six aircraft had been delivered.

=== Spain ===
The PC-21 has been evaluated by the Spanish Air Force (along with the Beechcraft T-6 Texan II and the PZL-130 Orlik III), to serve as the gradual replacement for their older training aircraft models ENAER T-35 Pillan and CASA C-101 Aviojet trainer aircraft. January 2020 saw the Spanish Air Force confirm an order for 24 of a total 40 PC‑21 aircraft. The first two examples arrived in September 2021, and the initial batch from that first order was completed in June 2022. Deliveries of the second batch of 16 aircraft —announced in 2023— began in June 2025. PC-21 aircraft will replace the CASA C-101 Aviojet, but will also take over advanced training, which is currently carried out on the T-35 Pillan. As an incidental detail, during the military training programme for the heir to the Spanish throne, Her Royal Highness Leonor, Princess of Asturias, completed her training and her first solo flight in one of the received Pilatus aircraft.

=== Switzerland ===
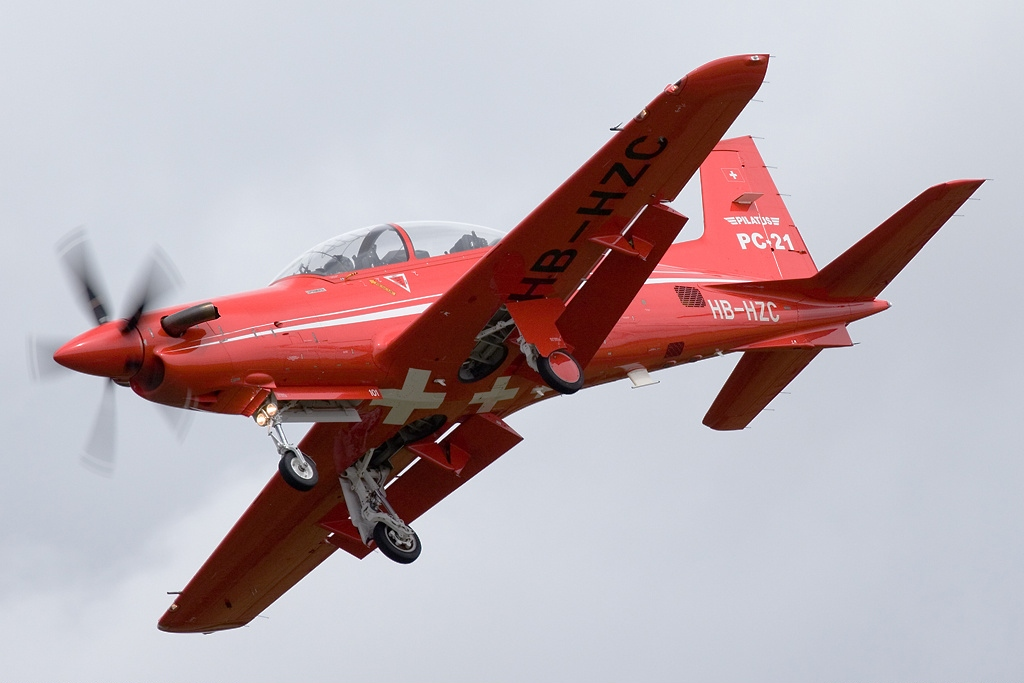
A PC-21 landing at RAF Fairford, England, 2010

In the Armament Program 2006, the Swiss Parliament approved an initial purchase of the PC-21 for the Swiss Air Force. By April 2008, four PC-21 have been accepted by the Swiss Air Force following the passing of acceptance trials, and flight operations were set to start in July that year. In December 2010, the Swiss Air Force placed an order for another two aircraft.

=== United Arab Emirates ===
During the 2009 Dubai Airshow, the United Arab Emirates announced an order of 25 PC-21 trainers for the United Arab Emirates Air Force (UAEAF) to replace its aging fleet of Pilatus PC-7s. On 22 November 2010, the UAEAF's first PC-21 performed its maiden flight.

=== Canada ===
On May 19, 2026, the Royal Canadian Air Force (RCAF) announced a decision to purchase the CT-157 Siskin II (Pilatus PC-21) to replace the current Canadair CT-114 Tutor fleet. The new aircraft will serve as both a training and air demonstration aircraft. This decision marks the end of an era for the Snowbirds air demonstration squadron, which has been in service since 1971. The new Snowbirds fleet will be operational in the early 2030s and will be based at 15 Wing Moose Jaw, Saskatchewan.

== Operators ==
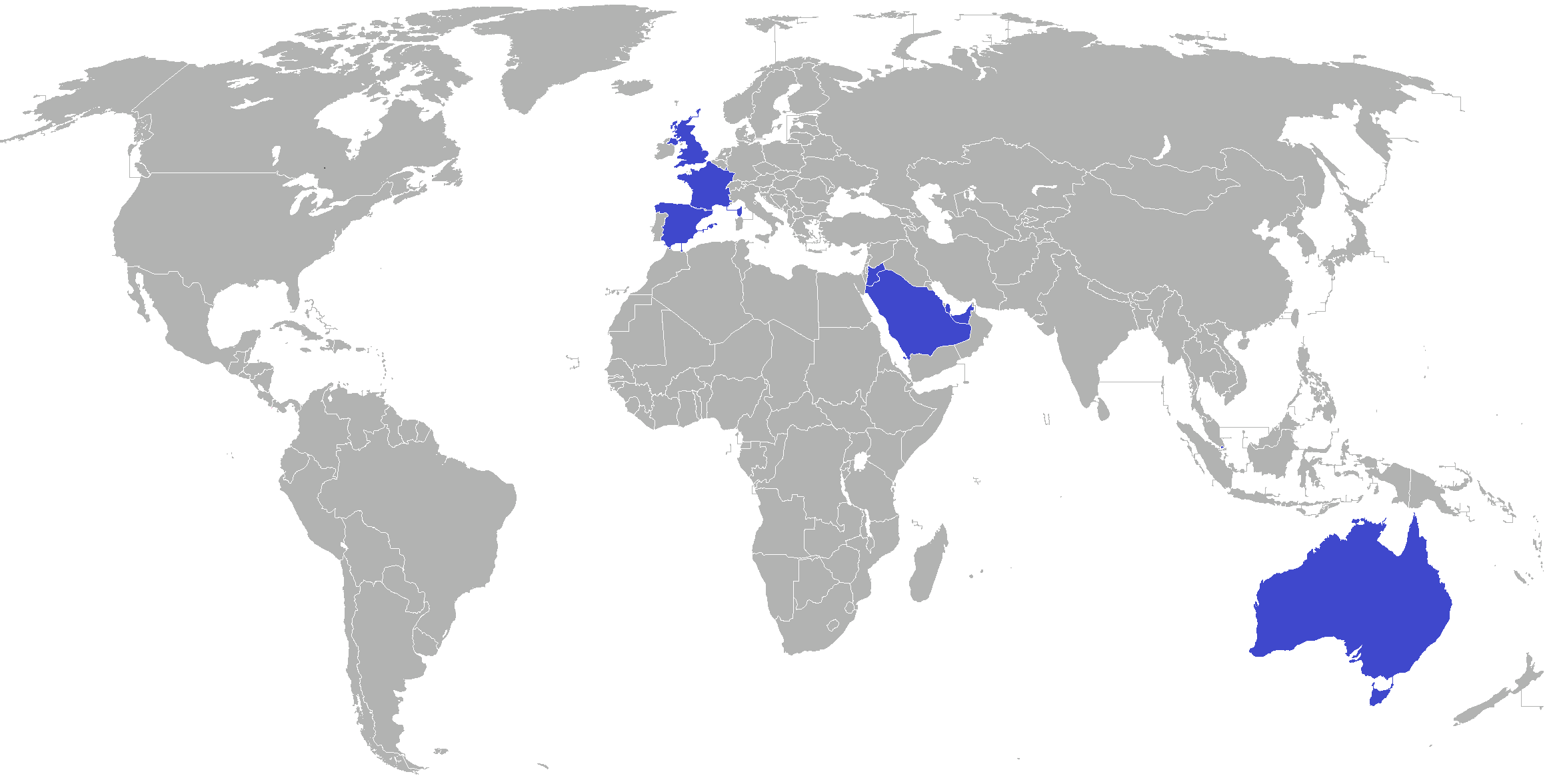
Main countries in which the Swiss Pilatus PC-21 aircraft operates in the world.

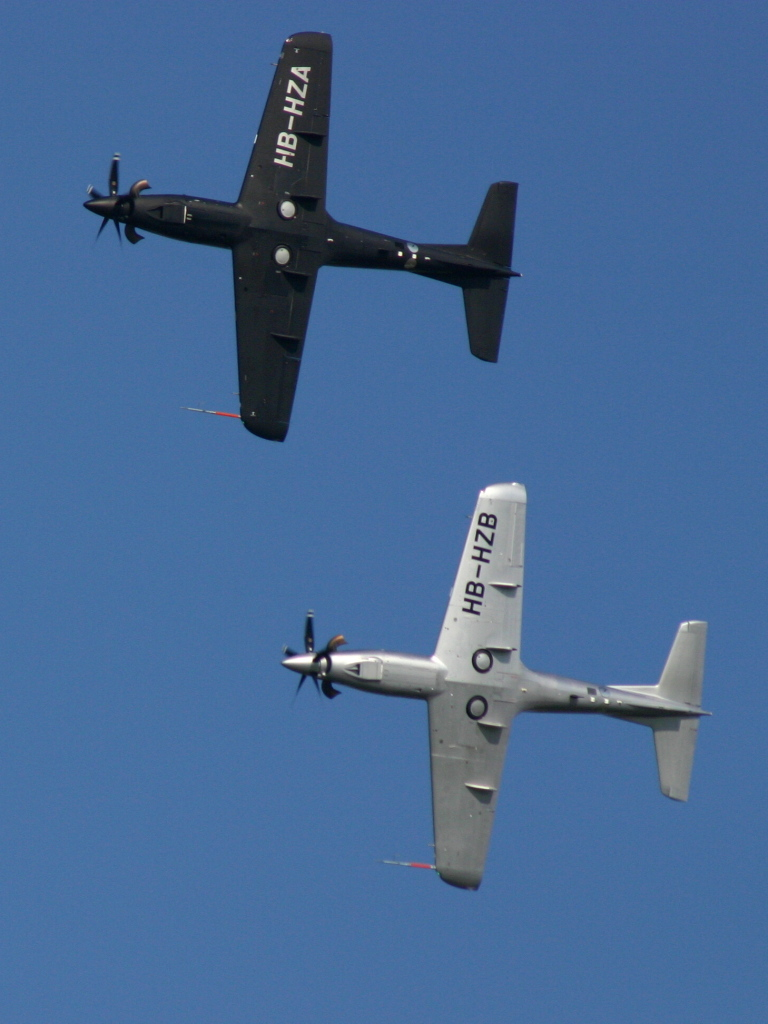
Pair of PC-21s, 2004

=== Current operators ===
Australia (49)
Royal Australian Air Force: 49 ordered September 2015, deliveries completed November 2019.
Canada (2 delivered + 17 on order)
SkyAlyne was selected to train the future Canadian Air Force pilot in cooperation with CAE and KF Aerospace through the programme FAcT (Future Aircrew Training). The pilots will be trained on Grob 120TP (CT-102B Astra II), PC-21 (CT-157 Siskin II), King Air 260 (CT-145E Expeditor II), H135 (CT-153 Juno) and Dash 8-400 (CT-142Q Citadel) depending on the assignment.
The purchase was confirmed in November 2024.
The first delivery took place in May 2026.
France (17 + 9)
French Air and Space Force (Armée de l'air et de l'espace): 17 ordered January 2017, all delivered by August 2019, 9 additional ordered in 2021 to be delivered in 2023.
Jordan (12)
Royal Jordanian Air Force: 12 delivered as of August 2019 (8 ordered in 2015 instead of 9 PC-9M, 2 additional option converted in October 2016, 2 additional ordered in January 2017.
Qatar (24)
Qatar Emiri Air Force: 24 ordered July 2012, first delivery in 2014.
Saudi Arabia (55)
Royal Saudi Air Force: 55 ordered May 2012, first delivery in 2014.
Singapore (19)
Republic of Singapore Air Force: launch customer; operates 19 in Australia on Basic Wings Course (BWC) as part of a contract for availability, together with Lockheed Martin and Hawker Pacific.
Spain (40)
Spanish Air and Space Force: total of 40 purchased in two batches.
Orders:
- 24 ordered in January 2020, the deliveries of the first batch took place in:
  - September 2021, first two PC-21 delivered
  - Last in mid-2022
- 16 ordered in March 2023, the deliveries of the first batch took place in:
  - First in June 2024
  - Last in November 2025.
Switzerland (8)
Swiss Air Force: operates 8 for advanced training, replacing the BAe Hawk which had been retired in 2003.
United Arab Emirates (25)
United Arab Emirates Air Force: operates 25 for advanced training, first flight made on 22 November 2010. CHF 520 million deal
United Kingdom (2)
Qinetiq: operates two for advanced training on behalf of the Empire Test Pilot School at Boscombe Down.

=== Future operators ===
Canada
Royal Canadian Air Force: On May 19, 2026, the RCAF announced that the PC-21 will replace the Canadair CT-114 Tutor currently used by the Snowbirds (aerobatic team). The number of aircraft to be acquired has not yet been announced, but is expected to be between 11 and 17 based on prior proposals. 2026 will be the last Snowbirds season using the Tutor and subsequent seasons will use the PC-21/CT-157 Siskin II.
Indonesia (24)
Order in March 2026 of 24 PC-21 and 12 PC-24 for the training of pilots.

=== Potential customers ===
Bulgaria
Bulgarian Air Force: The Bulgarian Ministry of Defence will be in talks with Pilatus Aircraft to acquire PC-21 to replace its PC-9M (and possibly the L-39) as part of the F-16 Block 70 modernisation project.
Croatia
Croatian Air Force: The French company Defense Conseil International has proposed the establishment of a center for the training of fighter pilots in Pula, Croatia. The aircraft on which the training would be carried out is the PC-21.
Malaysia
Royal Malaysian Air Force
Poland
Polish Air Force: Pilatus is competing with Embraer and its A-29 Super Tucano to replace the PZL-130 Orlik.
Sweden
Swedish Air Force: requires a successor for its Saab 105 fleet. A strong contender is the T-7 Red Hawk, partially designed and manufactured by Saab, however the price of the PC-21 is an advantage.
United Kingdom
Pilatus joined the tender process for the replacement of the BAE Hawk of the Royal Air Force.

== Specifications (PC-21) ==
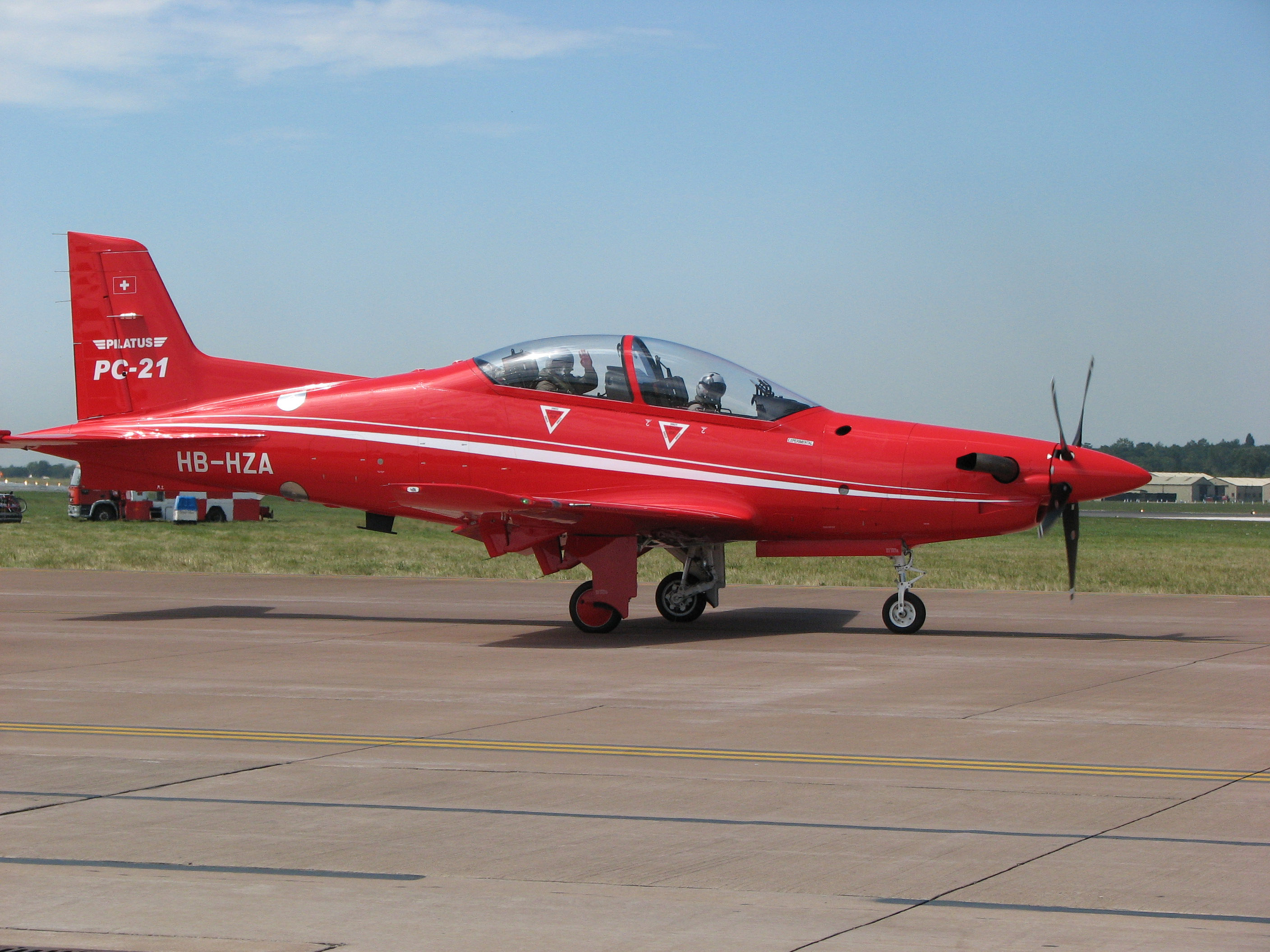
The Pilatus PC-21; note the stepped tandem cockpit

External videos
- Swiss Air Force PC-21 flight demonstration at the Breitling Sion Airshow 2011
- In-cockpit video of PC-21 takeoff
- PC-21s at Koor Airport, Qatar

Data from Pilatus Aircraft

General characteristics

- Crew: 2
- Length: 11.233 m (36 ft 10 in)
- Wingspan: 9.108 m (29 ft 11 in)
- Height: 3.74 m (12 ft 3 in)
- Wing area: 15.221 m^{2} (163.84 sq ft)
- Empty weight: 2,270 kg (5,004 lb)
- Gross weight: 3,120 kg (6,878 lb) (maximum ramp mass)
- Max takeoff weight: 3,100 kg (6,834 lb) aerobatic

4,250 kg (9,370 lb) normal

- Powerplant: 1 × Pratt & Whitney Canada PT6A-68B turboprop engine, 1,200 kW (1,600 hp)
- Propellers: 5-bladed constant-speed propeller, 2.39 m (7 ft 10 in) diameter

Performance

- Maximum speed: 685 km/h (426 mph, 370 kn) at sea level
- Cruise speed: 620 km/h (390 mph, 330 kn) at 10,000 ft (3,048 m)
- Stall speed: 170 km/h (110 mph, 92 kn) gear and flaps up (20 km/h (12 mph; 11 kn) less with flaps and gear down)
- Range: 1,333 km (828 mi, 720 nmi)
- Service ceiling: 11,580 m (37,990 ft)
- g limits: Aerobatic: +8.0 –4.0 aerobatic / with underwing stores: +5.0 to –2.5
- Roll rate: 200°/s at 10,000 ft (3,048 m)
- Rate of climb: 20.317 m/s (3,999.4 ft/min) sea level
- Wing loading: 208 kg/m^{2} (43 lb/sq ft)
- Power/mass: 0.39 kW/kg (0.24 hp/lb)

Armament

- Hardpoints: Provisions provided for 4× under-wing and 1× centerline external store stations, capable of mounting up to 1,150 kg (2,540 lb) of payload of air-to-ground weapons to operate in the counter-insurgency role.

== See also ==
Related development

- Pilatus PC-7
- Pilatus PC-9
  - Beechcraft T-6 Texan II

Aircraft of comparable role, configuration, and era

- Embraer EMB 314 Super Tucano
- KAI KT-1 Woongbi
- TAI Hürkuş
