= Admiral flote =

Senior rank in Croatian Navy

Fleet Admiral Admiral flote
- Rank flag

- Admiral flote shoulder strap insignia.
- Country: Croatia
- Service branch: Croatian Navy
- NATO rank code: OF-10
- Next higher rank: None
- Next lower rank: Admiral
- Equivalent ranks: Stožerni general

Admiral flote (lit. 'Fleet Admiral') is the fifth and highest Admiral of the Croatian Navy. This officer is referred to as, and is considered the equivalent of, a five-star Fleet Admiral. The insignia for a Croatian Senior Admiral is two thick rank stripes on both the sleeve and shoulder board. Between 1995 and 2002, the rank was called Stožerni admiral (transl. Staff Admiral), analogous to Stožerni general for the ground forces.

In the Croatian Navy, an admiral can be promoted to the rank of fleet admiral only for distinguished service during wartime, and there is currently no officer with this rank. There was only one fleet admiral, Sveto Letica (1926–2001), a senior admiral who commanded the fledgling Croatian Navy in the Croatian War of Independence and later retired.
