= MV Seaman Guard Ohio =

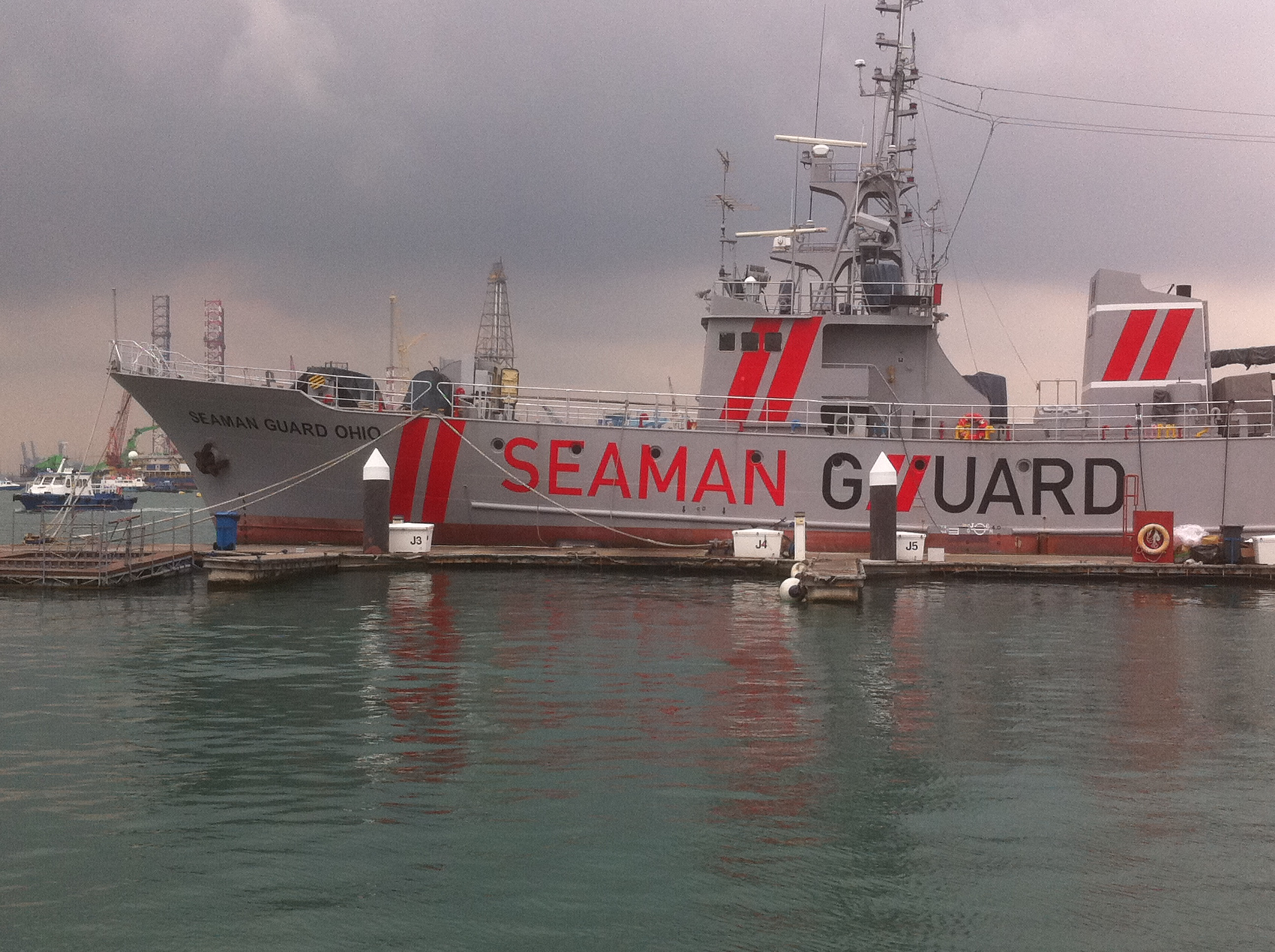
- MV Seaman Guard Ohio photographed at Singapore, July 2012

History
- Owner: AdvanFort
- Port of registry: Freetown, Sierra Leone
- Builder: Narasaki Shipbuilding, Muroran, Japan
- Yard number: 1064
- Launched: 20 August 1984
- Completed: 1984
- Identification: IMO number: 8410691; MMSI number: 667004026

General characteristics
- Tonnage: 394 GT; 197 DWT
- Length: 45.93 metres (150.7 ft)
- Beam: 7.32 metres (24.0 ft)
- Installed power: 2800 bhp

The MV Seaman Guard Ohio is a floating armory ship owned by AdvanFort and used for storing weapons and security guards on private anti-piracy contracts. In October 2013, the ship was impounded and the crew and armed guards aboard were detained after it allegedly entered Indian waters with illegal arms without adequate permission. After four years of imprisonment, the crew were acquitted and released.

== Ship ==
The MV Seaman Guard Ohio is a Sierra Leone (flag of convenience)–flagged former fishery patrol vessel (Call Sign: 9LA2125, IMO: 8410691, MMSI: 667004026) owned and operated by AdvanFort, an American private maritime security company that provides commercial anti-piracy protection services to merchant vessels. The vessel is equipped with a wide array of directive and omnidirectional radio-communications sensors including numerous VHF, UHF, HF and satellite communications antennae, maritime radars and satellite navigation systems.

The ship was built for Hokkaido Prefecture by Narasaki Shipbuilding of Muroran, Japan, and was originally named the Kaio Maru. In May 2011 she was renamed Timor Navigator, and in January 2012 Seaman Guard Ohio.

== History ==
=== Interception by Indian Coast Guard ===
The MV Seaman Guard Ohio was intercepted on 12 October 2013 beyond the ICC CSS High Risk Area and within Indian Customs Waters by ICGS Naiki Devi. The vessel was escorted to the V.O. Chidambaranar Port in Thoothukudi (Tuticorin). The 10 crew and 25 guards were interrogated by a federal multi-agency joint investigation team comprising members of the Indian Coast Guard, Indian Navy, Customs, Research and Analysis Wing and the Q Branch of India's Intelligence Bureau.

On 10 July 2014, a judge of the Madras High Court dismissed the charges against the crew and armed guards, while reaffirming that the captain and the fuel vendor were liable to punishment for the ship's being refueled with subsidized diesel fuel.

On 1 July 2015, the Indian Supreme Court heard an appeal filed by the CID 'Q' Branch police against the 2014 judgement by the Madras High Court. Supreme Court Bench of Justices Vikramjit Sen and Abhay Manohar Sapre set aside the High Court's decision as "illegal and erroneous." explaining that "The very fact that huge quantity of arms and ammunition were recovered from the possession of the crew members from the vessel and they were unable to satisfy their legal possession over such arms/ammunition is sufficient to attract the provisions of Arms Act,". The Supreme Court ordered the Tuticorin District Principal Sessions Court to complete the trial of the case and give its judgment within six months.

On 11 January 2016, judge of Tuticorin District Principal Sessions Court sentenced all the 10 crew and 25 guards to undergo 5 years of imprisonment and a fine of Rs. 3000 each.

On 27 November 2017, the crew and guards were acquitted again. While the court's ruling was that all charges against the men be dropped, that they should be released from custody with immediate effect and the fines already paid be refunded, legal authorities anticipated further delays in repatriation. The British crew, termed the "Chennai Six", had returned to the United Kingdom by January 2018. One of the men, Nick Dunn, later described the ordeal in his book Surviving Hell. Dunn also released images of the prison conditions captured on a "spy-pen" his sister had slipped him during a visit.
