= RMS St Helena (1989) =

British cargo liner in service 1990–2018

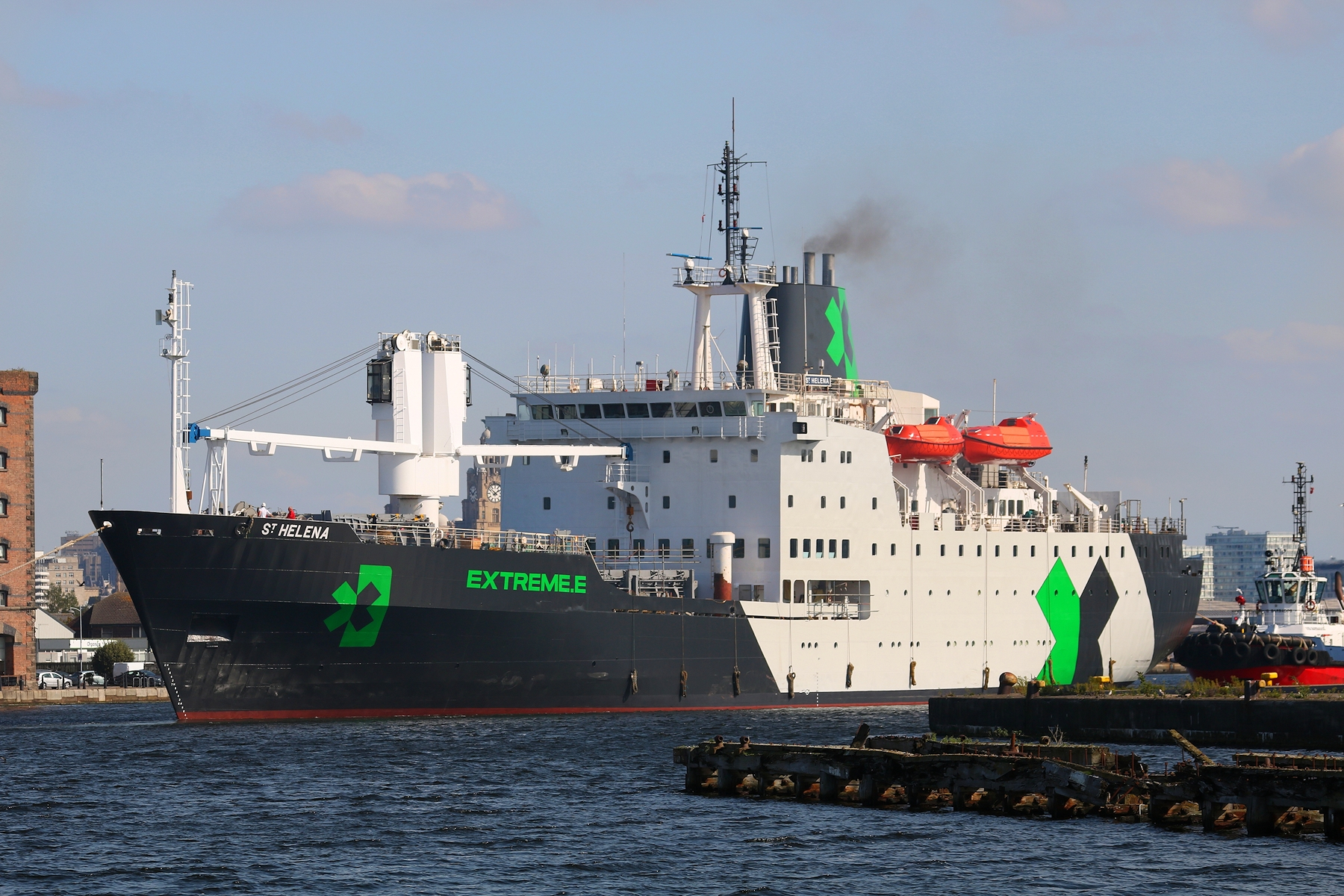
- The St Helena in 2020 with Extreme E livery

History

United Kingdom
- Name: St Helena
- Owner: St Helena Line Ltd
- Operator: 1990–2001: Curnow Shipping Ltd, Porthleven; 2001–2018: Andrew Weir Shipping Ltd, London
- Port of registry: London, United Kingdom
- Route: Cape Town - Saint Helena
- Ordered: November 1987
- Builder: A&P-Appledore (Aberdeen) Ltd
- Cost: €19.5 million
- Yard number: 1000
- Laid down: 15 July 1988
- Launched: 31 October 1989
- Christened: 31 October 1989
- Completed: late 1989
- Acquired: 1990
- Maiden voyage: 1990
- In service: 1990
- Out of service: 17 February 2018
- Identification: IMO number: 8716306; Call sign: MMHE5; MMSI number: 232669000
- Status: Currently in operation with Terra Nova Expeditions

Saint Kitts and Nevis
- Name: April 2018 MNG Tahiti; October 2018 St Helena
- Owner: April 2018 Tahiti Shipping Ltd, Wimborne, Dorset; October 2018 St Helena LLC, Jersey
- Operator: April 2018 MNG Maritime, Wimborne, Dorset; October 2018 Wilson Yacht Management Ltd, Hessle, Yorkshire
- Port of registry: Basseterre, Saint Kitts and Nevis
- Identification: IMO number: 8716306; Call sign: V4UA3; MMSI number: 232669000
- Status: Support ship for Extreme E motor racing series

General characteristics
- Class & type: Cargo liner
- Tonnage: 6,767 GT
- Length: 105 m (344 ft)
- Beam: 19.2 m (63 ft)
- Draft: 6 m (20 ft)
- Decks: 4
- Ramps: 2 (for cargo and vehicles)
- Ice class: 1C (Polar Class 4)
- Installed power: 6,532 kW
- Propulsion: one propeller, diesel
- Speed: 14.5 knots (26.9 km/h; 16.7 mph)
- Capacity: 155 passengers, 1,800 tonnes cargo
- Crew: 56 officers and crew
- Notes: Operated on behalf of Royal Mail Group Ltd (UK)

RMS St Helena is a cargo liner (carrying cargo and passengers) that served the British overseas territory of Saint Helena. She sailed between Cape Town and Saint Helena with regular shuttles continuing to Ascension Island. Some voyages also served Walvis Bay en route to and from, or occasionally instead of, Cape Town. She visited Portland, Dorset twice a year with normal calls in the Spanish ports of Vigo (northbound) and Tenerife (southbound) until 14 October 2011, when she set sail on her final voyage from the English port. She was one of the last cargo liners operating when she ceased service.

On 10 February 2018 she departed for her last trip from St Helena to Cape Town. At the time of her retirement from St Helena service she was one of only four ships in the world still carrying the status of Royal Mail Ship. Locals including local press have usually called her the RMS rather than the St. Helena, in order not to confuse her with the island itself.

In April 2018 she was purchased by MNG Maritime and renamed MNG Tahiti to act as a vessel-based armoury (VBA) licensed by the UK Department for International Trade (DIT) in the Gulf of Oman. In October 2018 MNG sold the ship and she returned to the UK renamed St Helena once more.

== Background ==
Formerly, Saint Helena island was occasionally served by ships of the Union-Castle Line, which ran between the UK and South Africa. By the 1970s the number of ships taking this route had declined significantly and Union-Castle withdrew from the route completely at the end of 1977. As Saint Helena lacked an airfield, the British government had to purchase a ship to service the remote island and its dependencies from Cape Town.

The British government purchased the part passenger, part cargo ship Northland Prince to fulfil the role of servicing Saint Helena, and after being refitted and renamed this became the first RMS St Helena. Originally built in 1963, this converted 3,150-ton ship had room to carry 76 passengers and supplies. The ship was used by the Royal Navy during the Falklands War as a minesweeper support ship. By the 1980s it was becoming apparent that the ship was too small for the island's needs, resulting in the new St Helena, built in 1989.

The island lacks a port suitable for large ships, so the RMS anchored near the island, and loaded and unloaded cargo to and from lighters.

== Characteristics ==
The new RMS St Helena, the last ship built in Aberdeen, was launched by Hall, Russell & Company in 1989. St Helena was a British registered Class 1 passenger/cargo ship, and operated with 56 officers and crew. St Helena was equipped to carry a wide range of cargo, including liquids, to meet the needs of the population of Saint Helena. She also had berths for 155 passengers and associated facilities including a swimming pool, shop, and lounges. She also had well-equipped medical facilities and an on-board doctor. The ship's capacity was extended in 2012 by the addition of 24 extra cabin berths, and a new gym was installed.

Some sources state that she had the nickname "Betty Blue Bucket".

AW Ship Management had a package deal where passengers could travel in one direction on the RMS and in the other by taking Royal Air Force flights to or from RAF Ascension Island and RAF Brize Norton in Brize Norton, England.

By the 2010s many construction workers building the airport and South African tourists were passengers. The shipboard culture had been inherited from previous Union Castle lines although formality became relaxed in response to changes in the customer base.

When she converted to a vessel-based armoury in May 2018, a rigid inflatable boat davit was fitted on the port side, and additional bunks installed, taking the capacity to 30 crew and 250 passengers.

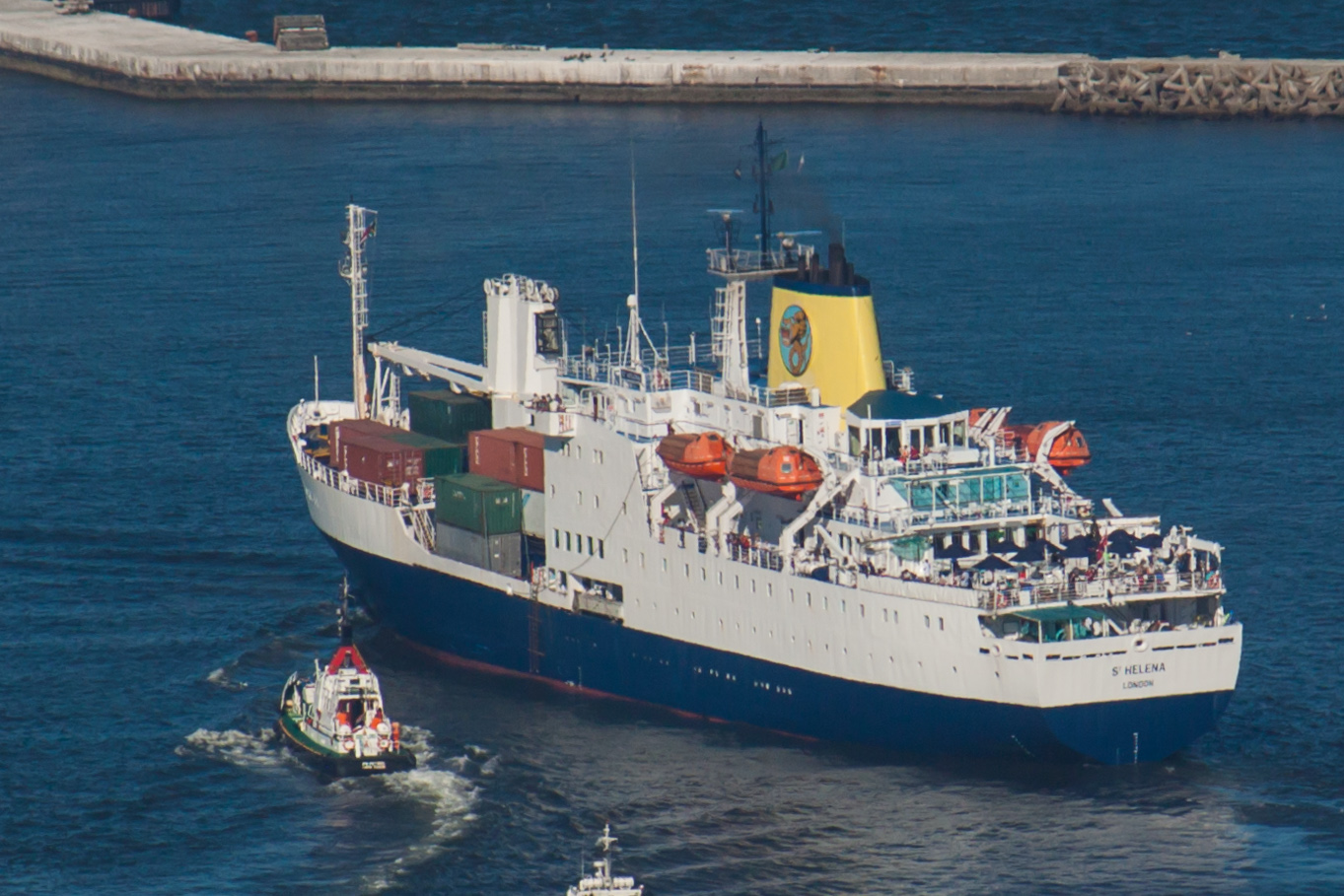
In Cape Town in 2013

== Incidents ==
In November 1999, St Helena broke down en route to the island and was forced into the French port of Brest to undergo repairs. Many people were left stranded on the island with no way in or out whilst the ship was being repaired. Panic-buying ensued as islanders became concerned about the non-delivery of vital supplies. This incident intensified calls for the island to be provided with an airport.

On 25 August 2000, St Helena suffered a minor engine room fire while sailing from Cardiff to Tenerife on the first leg of her journey to the island. No one was injured and there was no significant damage.

In March and April 2017 a number of Cape Town – Saint Helena voyages were cancelled because of technical problems with the propellers, making the island isolated as the airport was still not operational.

== Recent history ==
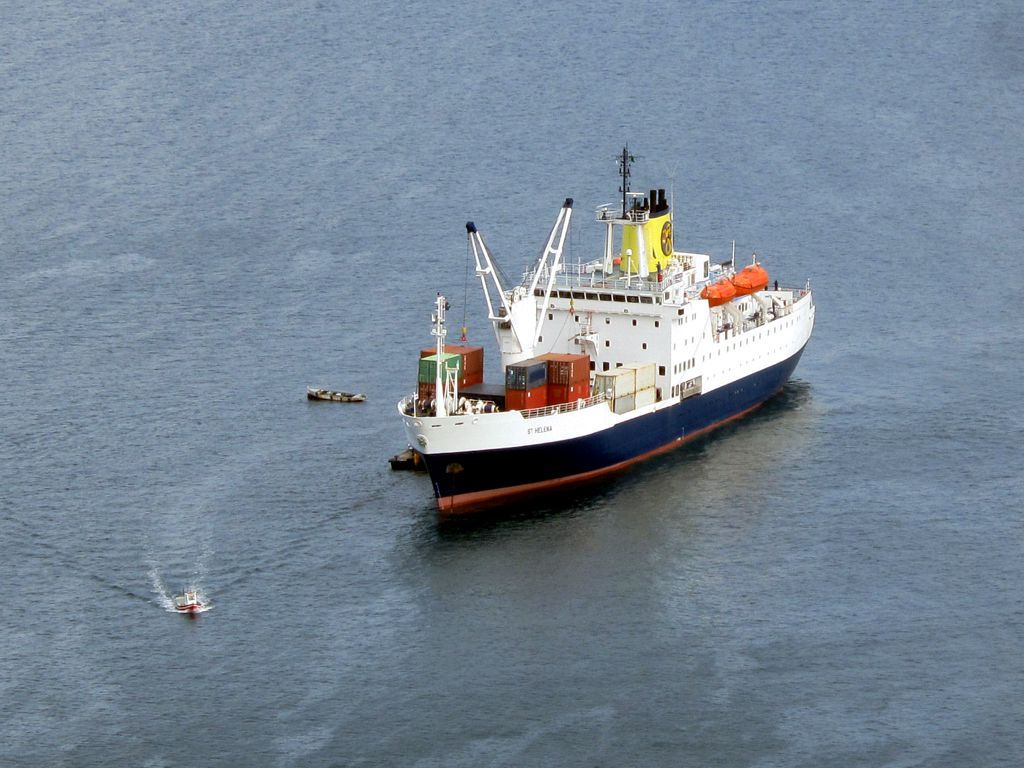
RMS St Helena in 2014

In 2005 the British government announced plans to construct an airport on Saint Helena, which would lead to the withdrawal from service of the RMS St Helena. The airport was initially expected to be operational by 2010. However, it was not approved until October 2011, with work commencing in 2012. The estimated cost on the project is £240 million and the airport was due to open in the first quarter of 2016. However, due to concerns about wind shear, on 26 April 2016, the St. Helena Government announced an indefinite postponement to the opening of Saint Helena Airport. RMS St Helena had been placed for disposal via London shipbrokers CW Kellock, but was subsequently restored to service.

The voyage originally intended as her final one began on 14 June 2016 from the UK and ended on 15 July in Cape Town, calling at Tenerife, Ascension Island and St Helena. As part of its farewell voyage, Royal Mail organised a letter exchange with pupils from Cardiff and St Helena. However, due to the postponed opening of the airport, the schedule of RMS St Helena was extended as an interim measure. The ship was initially scheduled to run until July 2017, and then February 2018. After the opening of Saint Helena Airport to scheduled passenger flights on 14 October 2017, RMS St Helena was withdrawn from service, and her last sailing from St Helena Island was on 10 February 2018. The day before the scheduled departure was designated a public holiday and an open day was held, giving people the opportunity to look around the ship. The ship had to unexpectedly return to St Helena on 12 February due to a medical emergency on board.

Freight services for the Saint Helena island have been taken over by the MV Helena cargo ship, which does carry a limited number of passengers, and mail and other express freight by the passenger aircraft. The first passenger on the MV Helena stated that unlike the RMS St Helena, the new ship, with a lower capacity, is strictly geared towards cargo, although some former RMS employees had become crew on the new ship.

In April 2018, St Helena was purchased by MNG Maritime and entered service as a vessel-based armoury in the Gulf of Oman named MNG Tahiti to supply weaponry to ships travelling through the High Risk Area of heightened pirate activity in the Indian Ocean. In October 2018, the vessel was resold to St Helena LLC, Jersey and in 2019 the ship was refitted to act as a mobile hub for the race events of the Extreme E electric SUV racing series. She was used to carry all equipment, including the cars, to the race locations.

In July 2025 Terra Nova Expeditions announced they would be operating St Helena as an expedition cruise vessel, departing on various itineraries from a home port of Ushuaia, Argentina. The first Antarctic voyage is scheduled to depart in December 2026. As at April 2026 she is under refit and registered in Djibouti, with undisclosed owners.

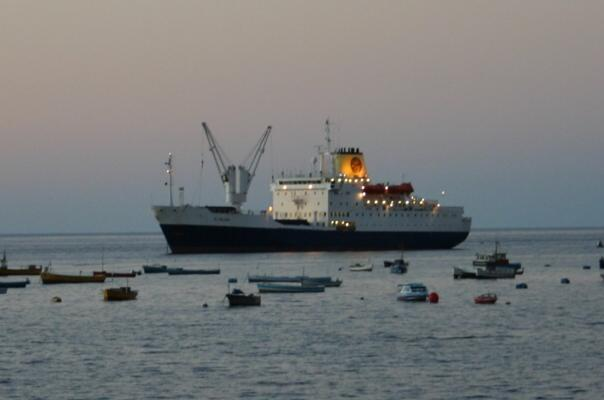
Anchored James Bay, Island of St. Helena

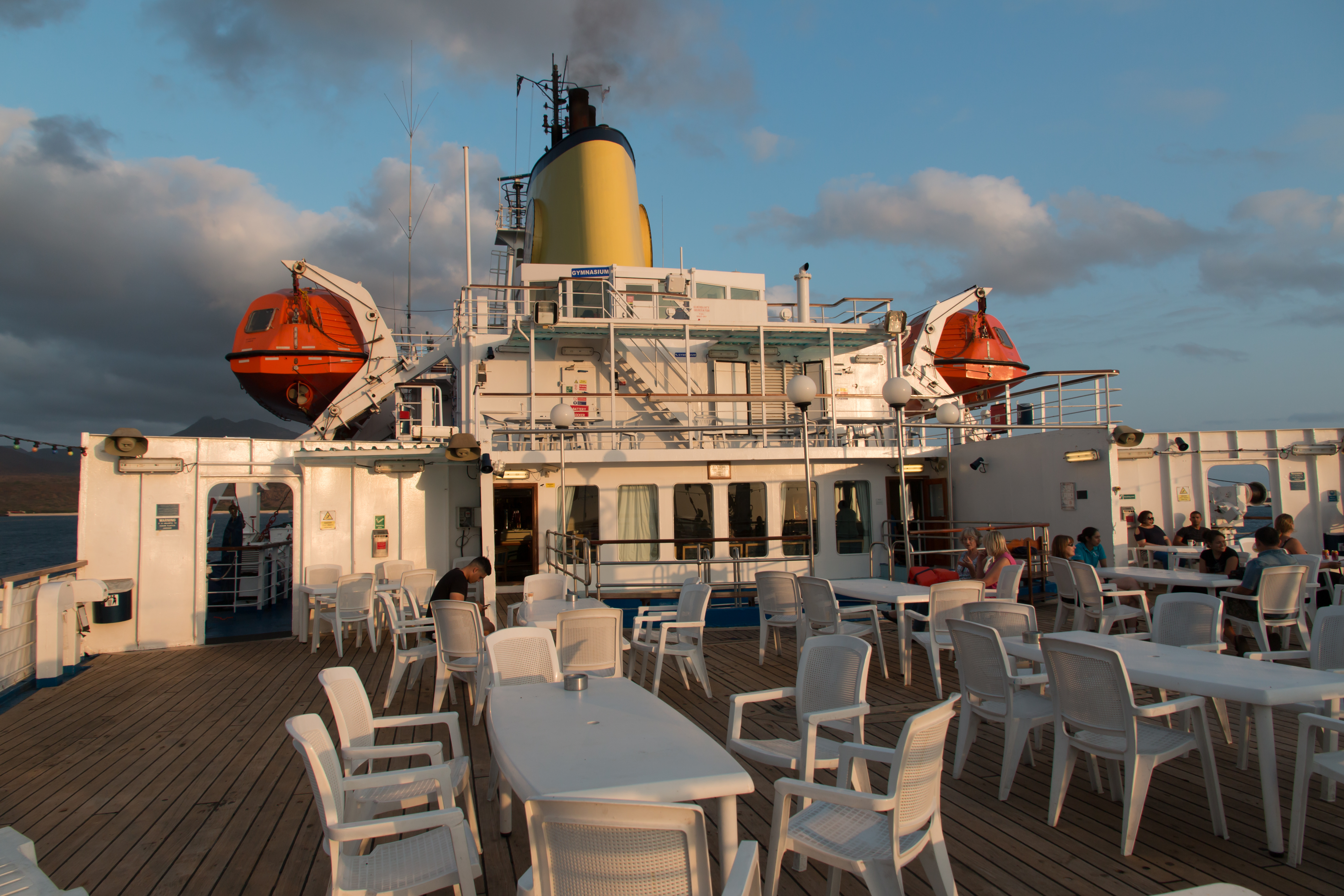
Aft Deck of RMS St Helena

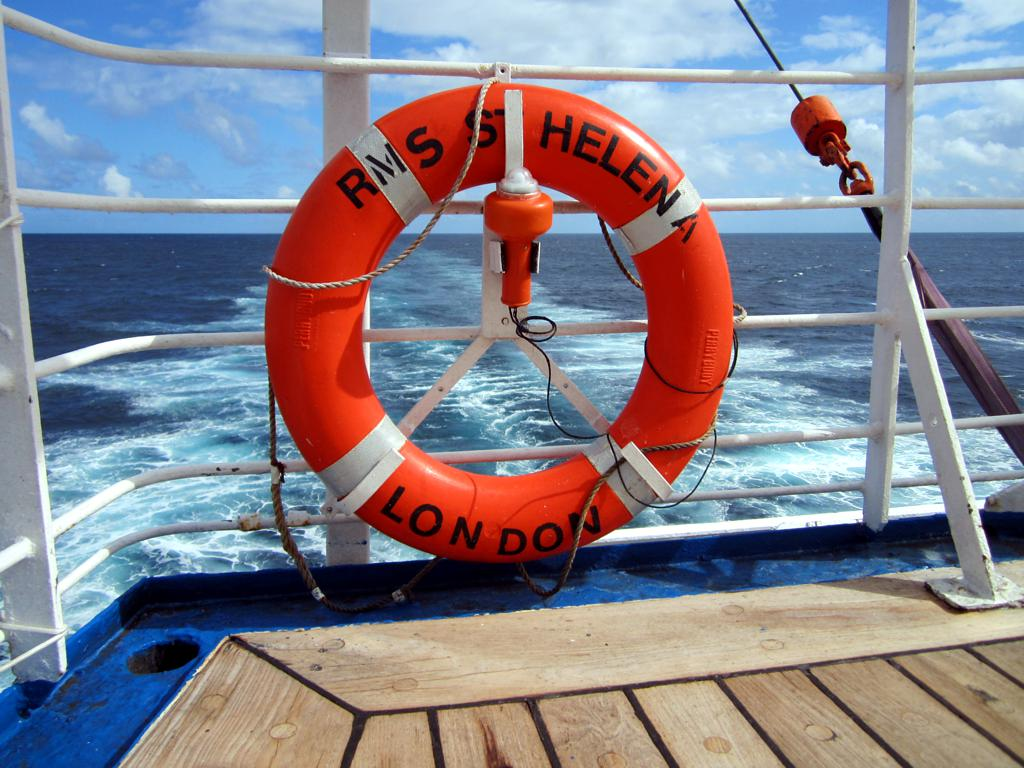
Life ring
