= AdvanFort =

US private maritime security company

- Industry: Security and safety
- Predecessor: Samir Farajallah
- Founded: 2009
- Founder: Samir Farajallah
- Successor: William H Watson
- Headquarters: Herndon, Virginia, USA
- Number of locations: 17 offices in 16 countries
- Area served: Horn of Africa, Indian Ocean, Far East, Red Sea, Arabia Sea, Persian Gulf and Gulf of Oman
- Key people: Ahmed Farajallah aka (Al Farajallah) Acting President
- Services: Security solutions in high risk areas
- Revenue: 21,000,000USD
- Number of employees: 100
- Divisions: 2
- Website: advanfort.com

AdvanFort is a US private maritime security company founded in 2009 and headquartered in Herndon, Virginia. It focuses on defense and homeland security products, technologies and services. Currently it has more than 100 employees and 200 contractors. In addition to groups of security teams working in several areas of the world and a fleet of operator support vessels in the Indian Ocean, the company has both a mission operations center and a threat analysis center. Until July 2013, it published weekly global piracy threat analysis, available without charge on its website.

On 11 October 2013, the MV Seaman Guard Ohio, a floating armory operated by AdvanFort, was captured by the Indian Coast Guard while anchored 3.8 nautical miles within their sovereign waters.

== Company ==
AdvanFort is a US private maritime security company. It is a signatory with the International Code of Conduct (ICoC) for Pirate Security Providers, and certified with the International Maritime Law Enforcement Academy (IMLEA) The company also belongs to the Security Association for the Maritime Industry (SAMI). It is headquartered in Herndon, Virginia, near Washington, D.C., and also has offices in Turkey, Japan and South Korea, among other countries. AdvanFort is a corporate sponsor of Piracy Daily and sponsors "white papers" on anti-piracy issues.

AdvanFort specializes in maritime security including training, intelligence operations, and information security, and has a focus on providing armed security personnel and fleet assets in high-risk environments. Its fleet of Offshore Supported Vessels (OSVs) allows the company to operate outside a sovereign nation's borders. Most PMSCs must go through the port security of the countries their clients embark from before escorting their clients on their trade route. AdvanFort has six OSVs: MV Seaman Guard Ohio, MV Seaman Guard Virginia, MV Seaman Guard Oklahoma, MV Seaman Guard Alaska, MV Seaman Guard Texas, and MV Seaman Guard Arizona. These vessels operate in the Arabian Sea, the Indian Ocean, and off the Eastern and Western coasts of Africa. In February 2013, the Panama Maritime Authority approved AdvanFort's counter-piracy operations for the world's largest ship registry. Previously almost entirely staffed by veterans of the US military, the company has attracted naval personnel from other countries, in particular Estonia, some of whom said in 2011 that they were not paid or were insufficiently armed. Also in 2011, the company pleaded guilty in a US district court to "Aiding and Abetting the Making of a False Statement During the Acquisition of Firearms" in connection with a purchase from a supplier who did not secure the correct export license, for which it paid a fine and began serving two years' probation in spring 2013.

AdvanFort is owned by US-based Arab billionaire Samir Farajallah, who was also previously its president. William H. Watson became president and COO of the company in August 2012. As of September 2012 the company's advisory board included Charles Dragonette, a retired Senior Commercial Maritime Operations Analyst at the U.S. Office of Naval Intelligence, Rear Admiral Joel Whitehead (USCG-Ret), John A.C. Cartner, a master mariner and maritime and admiralty attorney, and Michael Crye, an attorney and retired Coast Guard Captain. In January 2014 it was announced that Watson and Cartner had both left the company, amid rumors that it was financially shaky; vice chairman Ahmed Farajallah was appointed acting president and the company is being restructured.

== 2013 Seaman Guard Ohio incident ==
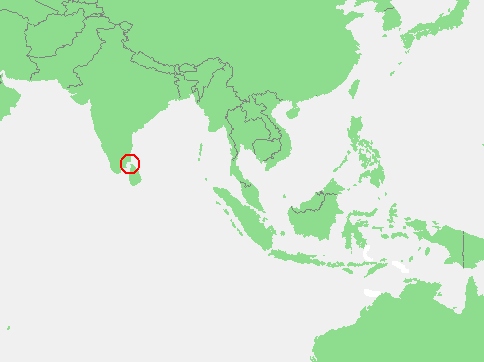
Gulf of Mannar

On 12 October 2013, the MV Seaman Guard Ohio was detained in what Indian authorities claimed were Indian Territorial waters by ICGS Naiki Devi and escorted to VOC Chidambaranar Port in Thoothukudi (Tuticorin). The ship had been close to a protected maritime conservation zone, the Gulf of Mannar Marine National Park, a Biosphere Reserve, but wasn't inside. The ship was apparently spotted via satellite while refuelling. Defense personnel claimed that the interception occurred as the Seaman Guard Ohio was anchored barely 3.8 nautical miles from the baseline from which Indian territorial waters commence. This corresponds to 10.75 nautical miles off Vilangushuli Island.

While in port, the crew were denied access to welfare facilities offered by The Mission to Seafarers.

AdvanFort stated that the ship did not have permission to sail into Indian waters, but that it had done so partly to avoid the effects of Cyclone Phailin and had been invited to do so by the Coast Guard, for which the company president thanked the Indian government. AdvanFort called the arrests of crew members "inappropriate" and said that the company would explore diplomatic and legal avenues to obtain their release. Advanfort was subsequently accused of not supporting its contractors, leaving them to pay for their own defence, bail, food, and housing.

Indian maritime authorities claimed that the master of the vessel had not obtained clearances to enter Indian waters, and that the refueling, "suspected to be subsidised diesel in this case, within the Customs Waters ... can amount to smuggling ... The question of escaping from Phailin does not arise as the cyclone had no impact in that area."

According to the Coast Guard Commandant Anand Kumar, the ship's master did not explain why the ship was patrolling in the Bay of Bengal when its permit was limited to the Indian Ocean, and why the permits were given to the Q branch but not produced before the court for the weapons and ammunition the ship was carrying. Indian authorities impounded the ship as well as 35 weapons after being in port for 7 days, including semi-automatic rifles along with around 5,700 rounds of ammunition, until paperwork demonstrating permission to enter Indian waters could be shown. The 10 crew and 25 guards aboard—14 Estonians, 12 Indians, 6 Britons and 3 Ukrainian—were not interrogated by a federal multi-agency joint investigation team made up of members of the Indian Coast Guard, Indian Navy, Customs, Research and Analysis Wing (RAW) and the Q Branch of Intelligence Bureau. Between 18 and 19 October they were disembarked and remanded to judicial custody until 31 October; they were interned at Palayamkottai Central Prison in Tirunelveli. On October 23, 22 of the 23 foreign citizens were transferred to Puzhal Central Prison in Chennai. On 25 October, the Q Branch of Tamil Nadu Police were given custody of a British national and two Indian nationals for five days. On October 30 they and the Indians who had sold them fuel were denied bail.

Tamil Nadu Police Coastal Security Group filed an FIR against the crew and guards of the ship on 13 October, for unauthorised entrance into Indian waters in the Bay of Bengal with arms and ammunition and also for improper purchase of subsidized marine fuel. Indian investigators had involved US embassy officials in the probe.

In late December 2013 an Indian court made a provisional ruling ordering all crew members of the Seaman Guard Ohio released on bail, but bail was subsequently revoked and the crew ordered to be held in custody until completion of the investigation. On 14 February 2014, the Thoothukudi court gave individual copies of the 2,158-page charge-sheet to all those accused in connection with the case and extended the judicial custody of those detained to 25 February 2014. On 18 February, the Madras High Court dismissed the petition for bail introduced by twelve Indian detainees.

On 14 March 2014, the relatives of six former British soldiers included among those jailed delivered a 136,000-strong petition to Downing Street seeking the help of the British prime minister in securing bail for the men by making the UK government a guarantor for their bail conditions. On 26 March 2014, the Madurai Bench of the Madras High Court granted conditional bail to 33 of the 35 Advanfort employees held in India. Bail applications of ship captain Dudnik Valentyn and tactical deployment officer Paul David Dennish Towers were dismissed by the High Court as well as a lower court.

On 22 May 2014, Judicial Magistrate Kathiravan turned down a petition by Advanfort to secure the release of MV Seaman Guard Ohio.

On 10 July 2014, Justice P N Prakash of the Madras high court dismissed criminal charges filed against the crew and armed-guards of the MV Seaman Guard Ohio under the Arms Act. The judge explained the reasons for the detention of the vessel as well as dismissal of criminal charges by saying: "I hold that the anchoring of MV Seaman Guard Ohio within our territorial sea was out of necessity and their action is saved by the principle of 'innocent passage' contemplated by Section 4(1) of the Territorial Waters, Continental Shelf, Exclusive Economic Zone and Other Maritime Zone Act, 1976 and Article 18 and 19 of UNCLOS. Therefore, the crew and the security guards cannot be prosecuted for an offence under the Arms Act." Justice P N Prakash reaffirmed that both the Captain of the MV Seaman Guard Ohio and the supplier of 10 drums of diesel fuel are punishable under the Essential Commodities and Control Act for the improper purchase of subsidized marine fuel.

Tamil Nadu CID ‘Q’ Branch police lodged an appeal with the Indian Supreme Court against the ruling handed out at the Chennai (Madras) High Court.

On 1 July 2015, the Indian Supreme Court heard an appeal filed by the CID ‘Q’ Branch police against the 2014 judgment by the Madras High Court. Supreme Court Bench of Justices Vikramjit Sen and Abhay Manohar Sapre set aside the High Court's decision as “illegal and erroneous,” explaining that “The very fact that huge quantity of arms and ammunition were recovered from the possession of the crew members from the vessel and they were unable to satisfy their legal possession over such arms/ammunition is sufficient to attract the provisions of Arms Act,”. The Supreme Court ordered the Tuticorin District Principal Sessions Court to complete the trial of the case and give its judgment within six months.

The crew of MV Seaman Guard Ohio, already freed from police custody but forced to remain in India, could only obtain their "No Objection Certificate" (NOC) from the Q branch —the agency that pressed the charges in the first place.

The case was noteworthy for its potentially important legal ramifications for India's interpretation of its maritime sovereignty.

On 11 January 2016, judge of Tuticorin District Principal Sessions Court sentenced all the 10 crew and 25 guards to undergo five years of imprisonment and a fine of ₹3,000 each.

On Monday, 27 November 2017, the Madurai bench of the Madras High Court announced that the accused had been acquitted as the prosecution had failed to prove definitively that they were in Indian waters, and that the prosecution had 'failed to prove that the ship had been engaged in any of the activities prejudicial to the peace, good order and security [of India].' The court found that the base line drawn on the sea chart by the authorities had not been proven as accurate by an appropriate expert witness, nor had the official who had originally marked the location of the vessel been examined in open court; no reason had been given by the prosecution for lack of the examination of the official. The court, however, did note that the vessel 'was anchored at the given place on account of distress for want of provisions and fuel.' All foreign members left India.

== See also ==
- MNG Maritime, a similar company
