= 2002 Saint Helena referendum =

21 January – 1 February 2002
- [_] I WOULD LIKE to have an airport on St Helena, with alternative arrangements being made for shipping. [_] I WOULD NOT LIKE to have an airport but would like to have a replacement RMS St Helena.

Results
Choice	Votes	%
Airport	1,577	71.58%
New ship	626	28.42%
Valid votes	2,203	99.41%
Invalid or blank votes	13	0.59%
Total votes	2,216	100.00%
Registered voters/turnout	4,473	49.54%

A referendum on building a new airfield or replacing RMS St Helena was held in Saint Helena between 21 January and 1 February 2002. Around 72% voted in favour of the airport, although critics claimed that the referendum was slanted in favour of this option.

== Background ==
RMS St Helena was the island's only connection with the outside world, but required replacing at an estimated cost of £26 million. The cost of the alternative option of a new airport was estimated at £50 million. The island's Executive Council initially rejected holding a referendum, but agreed to do so on 8 January 2002.

All Saint Helena citizens aged over 16 and based in Saint Helena, Ascension Island, the Falkland Islands and on board RMS St Helena were eligible to vote. Voters were given the options:

- I WOULD LIKE to have an airport on St Helena, with alternative arrangements being made for shipping.
- I WOULD NOT LIKE to have an airport but would like to have a replacement RMS St Helena.

== Results ==
Choice	Votes	%
Airport	1,577	71.58
New ship	626	28.42
Invalid/blank votes	13	–
Total	2,216	100
Registered voters/turnout	4,473	49.54
Source: Direct Democracy
