= Floating armoury =

Vessels for weapon storage

Floating armouries are vessels used to store military grade weapons. Being in possession of military-grade weapons in most jurisdictions is highly controlled. In the early twenty-first century, piracy in international waters became a serious issue for shipping companies. In response, services that supply weapons on the high seas, often referred to as floating armouries, were implemented. These armouries provide transfer services to private maritime security companies (PMSCs); the controlled weapons are available in international waters, but never enter patrolled territorial waters—they are delivered by an armoury to a client's vessel, and returned, in international waters.

== Operations ==
Floating armories are converted from vessels built for other purposes, including tugs, cargo ships, trawlers and survey craft, and fly a flag of convenience. Their primary function is to provide offshore storage facilities for weapons used by anti-piracy guards protecting vessels traversing the part of the Indian Ocean known as the "High Risk Area", known hunting grounds of pirates from Somalia and elsewhere. According to Oceans Beyond Piracy, a non-profit organization monitoring maritime piracy, 40% of commercial cargo vessels carry armed guards. Due to weapons restrictions, their armaments cannot be taken into territorial waters. Thus, floating armouries exist as a workaround, loading and offloading in international waters. Services provided include weapon rentals, storage and maintenance services for weapons belonging to other security companies, and accommodations for security guards.

== Controversies ==
Floating armouries present security concerns to countries near the High Risk Area. Local governments, in particular India, worry that a floating armoury could be captured by pirates or terrorists. A statement from the Indian government said that the nation was "exposed and seriously threatened due to the presence of largely unregulated floating armouries with large amounts of undeclared weapons and ammunition".

The industry's lack of regulation has also been a cause of controversy. Logging practices for weaponry vary depending on the vessel, as do living conditions for on-board security personnel. As of 2015, at least 30 vessels have been identified, but the actual number of floating armouries in operation, and the size of on-board stockpiles, is unknown.

=== MV Seaman Guard Ohio incident ===
On 11 October 2013, the MV Seaman Guard Ohio, a floating armoury operated by AdvanFort, was captured by the Indian Coast Guard while anchored 3.8 nautical miles within their sovereign waters. The crew was detained and their assets seized, including 35 firearms and nearly 5,000 rounds of ammunition. The Crime Investigation Department of the state of Tamil Nadu stated that the entrance of the vessel into their territorial waters represented a "threat to internal security." According to the crew of the vessel, they had run out of fuel and drifted into Indian waters. The prosecution refuted this, saying that they could have contacted the Maritime Rescue Coordination Centre if that were the case. In 2015, the crew of the Seaman Guard Ohio were sentenced to five years in prison and a fine of 5,000 rupees, although that verdict was set aside on appeal.

=== Decline of piracy ===
Costs associated with pirate attacks went down by nearly 50% between 2012 and 2013, and no hijackings occurred in the High Risk Area between 2012 and 2017. By 2015, most acts of piracy were committed off the west coast of Africa and in the Indonesian archipelago. However, ships are prevented from carrying armed guards in those regions, as they pass through coastal waters. There is thus no demand for nearby offshore weapons storage, so floating armouries are confined to the High Risk Area.

== Historical use of the term ==
An older use of the term refers to ships no longer suitable for their original purpose, converted to use as armouries permanently located at a port (sometimes used also as training vessels). Examples include the e.g. USS Briarcliff (IX-3) in 1922, USS Illinois (BB-7) in 1924, and USS Sturgeon Bay (IX-27) in 1928.

== List of providers ==
- AdvanFort

- MV Seaman Guard Ohio

- AvantGard Maritime Services
- MNG Maritime

- MNG Tahiti

- Sovereign Global

== See also ==
- Privateer
