= Andrija Andabak =

- Nickname: Cile
- Born: 6 September 1956; Split, Croatia
- Died: 7 July 1992 (aged 35) Posavina
- Allegiance: Croatia
- Branch: Croatian Army
- Service years: 1991–1992
- Rank: colonel (posthumously)
- Conflicts: Croatian War of Independence
- Awards: Order of Duke Domagoj; Order of Petar Zrinski and Fran Krsto Frankopan; Homeland War Memorial Medal
- Spouse: Nada

Andrija Andabak (September 6, 1956 – July 7, 1992) was a Croatian soldier who distinguished himself in the Croatian War of Independence.

== Early life ==
Andrija Andabak was born in Split on 6 September 1956 from father Stjepan and mother Ruža. He spent his childhood in Nuštar, where he attended elementary school followed by secondary Technical school Ruđer Bošković in Vinkovci, as an electrical technician. He married Nada Čović on 27 December 1980. In 1981 he started working in Vupik, Vukovar. He got his first son Marko in 1981, and his second son Stjepan in 1984. He lived in a family home in Nuštar together with his brother Zvonimir, sister Dragica, father and mother.

=== Military training ===
During 1979/1980 he served as a conscript in JNA in Bitolj, Socialist Republic of Macedonia, where he was trained to work with 9M14 Malyutka anti-tank missiles. After that, he attended military exercises at least once a month.

== Beginning and course of the Croatian War of Independence ==
In June 1991 he volunteered to the 109. Vinkovci brigade, where he started his anti-tank military service with his first shot on 28 September 1991.

After he destroyed his 15th tank, commander Josip Zvirotić awarded him with a pistol, a Česká zbrojovka M75. His military success went a long way, so in 1992 Andabak was invited to dine at Banski dvori with the President of Croatia Franjo Tuđman, where he was welcomed by Anton Tus and Janko Bobetko as well. He worked as an instructor at the Croatian Military Academy in Zagreb.

On 10 April 1992 he destroyed his 31st tank (a T-55) and, by the time he died, his last M-84 tank as well. He is credited with destroying or disabling a total of 32 armoured fighting vehicles, of which 30 tanks (14 M-84 and 16 T-55), 1 infantry fighting vehicle and 1 armoured personnel carrier, more than any other Croatian soldier. He was killed on 7 July 1992 in Posavina and was buried in Nuštar.

== Legacy ==
He was posthumously awarded the rank of major, and later of lieutenant Colonel. On 19 December 1995 the family of the deceased received the Order of Duke Domagoj for Andrija Andabak's outstanding bravery and heroism in war. The medal itself is the highest military award a member of the Armed Forces of Croatia can receive. Prior to that, he was awarded the Order of Petar Zrinski and Fran Krsto Frankopan and the Homeland War Memorial Medal.

The Croatian Army awards a medal, named after him, to soldiers who destroy three or more AFV's. He was the first person to posthumously receive it.

In honor of Andrija Andabak, as well as all Nuštar's defenders who died in combat, a memorial tournament carrying his name is held each year.

Andrija Andabak was a skilled professional and excellent operator. He destroyed 32 armoured fighting vehicles by himself in only eight months of the War.

On 7 July 2009 a memorial plaque for Andrija Andabak was unveiled on his family house.

In 2015, he was selected as one of 12 people who represent symbols of the Homeland War and introduced as such into Croatian history textbooks.
