= Order of Duke Domagoj =

Order of Duke Domagoj Red kneza Domagoja
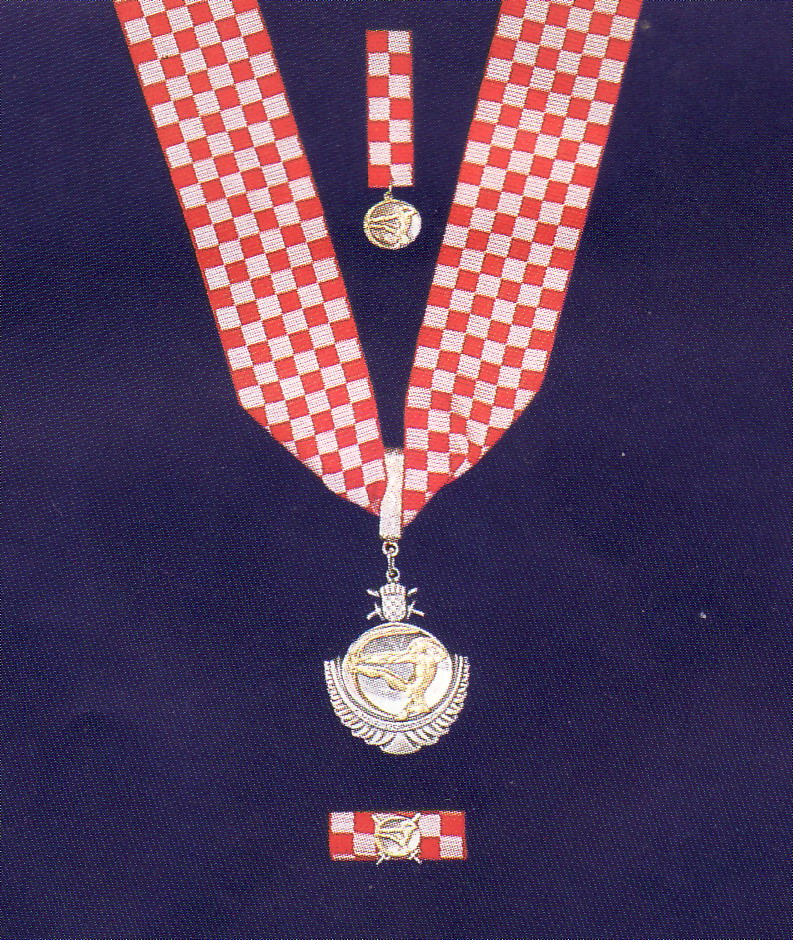
- Order of Duke Domagoj
- Type: Military decoration
- Awarded for: ... the demonstration of outstanding bravery and heroism in war, the direct threat of war, or in exceptional circumstances in peace.
- Description: Gold, naked, kneeling archer in centre of silver oval inscribed "KNEZ DOMAGOJ" (Duke Domagoj)
- Country: Republic of Croatia
- Presented by: the President of Croatia
- Eligibility: Croatian and foreign citizens.
- Status: Currently awarded
- Established: 10 March 1995
- First award: 1995

Highlights
- Total: 566 (as of 6 Mar 2013)
- Total awarded posthumously: 90
- Total recipients: 551
- Ribbon of the Order of Duke Domagoj

Precedence
- Next (higher): Order of Duke Branimir
- Next (lower): Order of Nikola Šubić Zrinski

The Order of Duke Domagoj (Croatian: Red kneza Domagoja) is the 8th most important medal given by the Republic of Croatia and is the nation's highest award for bravery. The order was founded on 1 April 1995. The medal is awarded for valor in combat. It is named after duke Domagoj of Croatia.

== Appearance and Wear ==
The order comprises a pure silver oval, 40 mm high and 50 mm wide, in the middle of which kneels a naked archer, fashioned from gold, his right foot tucked under his buttocks, his left stretched out. Below the archer is a semi-circular ornament in the form of a wave with the inscription KNEZ DOMAGOJ (PRINCE DOMAGOJ). At the top sits the coat of arms of Croatia, above diagonally crossed swords. The reverse is smooth with the Croatian wattle in the centre containing the inscription REPUBLIKA HRVATSKA (REPUBLIC OF CROATIA). At the upper tip of the religious symbol, on the coat of arms, there is a hitch for the ribbon.

The neckband is 36 mm wide and 600 mm long and shows the colors of the Croatian coat of arms, a red-silver check. The accompanying miniature is normally worn as a medal on the upper left breast.

== Notable recipients ==
- Rahim Ademi - Croatian general indicted, and subsequently cleared of war crimes by the International Criminal Tribunal for the Former Yugoslavia (ICTY).
- Ante Gotovina - Croatian general indicted and cleared of war crimes by the ICTY.
- Ante Kotromanović - Croatian Minister of Defence (2011–2016)
- Anton Kikaš - Arms smuggler during the Croatian war of independence
- Drago Lovrić - Chief of Staff of Croatian Armed Forces (2011–2016)
- Franjo Tuđman - President of Croatia (1990–1999)
- Anton Tus - Chief of Staff of Croatian Armed Forces (1991–1992)
- Mark Nicholas Gray - British Royal Marine who reduced the water level in the Peruća Lake, preventing the collapse of the Peruća Hydroelectric Dam.
- Predrag Matić - Croatian Minister of Veterans’ Affairs (2011–2016)
- Andrija Andabak - Croatian soldier
- Bruno Bušić - Croatian writer (1939–1978)
