= USS Sturgeon Bay =

United States Navy cargo ship

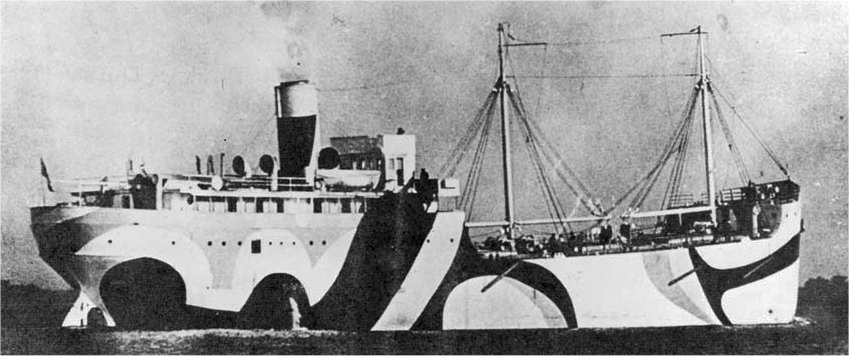

History

United States
- Name: USS Sturgeon Bay
- Owner: United States Shipping Board
- Builder: Rieboldt, Wolter & Company, Sturgeon Bay, Wisconsin
- Laid down: 14 July 1917
- Launched: 25 April 1918
- Sponsored by: Eleanor Wolter
- Acquired: 24 September 1921
- Commissioned: 7 June 1922
- Decommissioned: 7 February 1928
- Stricken: 7 February 1928
- Fate: Sold for scrapping, 5 March 1928

General characteristics
- Type: Freighter
- Tonnage: 826 long tons (839 t) (net)
- Length: 245 ft (75 m) p/p
- Beam: 42 ft (13 m)
- Draft: 23 ft 11 in (7.29 m)
- Depth of hold: 26 ft (7.9 m)
- Speed: 10 knots (19 km/h; 12 mph)

USS Sturgeon Bay was a wood-hulled freighter built in 1918 at Sturgeon Bay, Wisconsin for the United States Shipping Board during World War I.

== History ==
She was laid down on July 14, 1917, at Rieboldt, Wolter & Company shipyard at Sturgeon Bay, Wisconsin for the benefit of the Lake and Ocean Navigation Company of Chicago using Crosby & Sullivan (also of Chicago) as the general contractors. Prior to her launching, the contract was assigned or purchased by the United States Shipping Board's Emergency Fleet Corporation (EFC) due to a shortage of cargo ships during World War I and her design was modified (referred to as Design 1007). She was the only ship of her class which was usually referred to as the "Lake and Ocean"-type and she was the last ship built by the Rieboldt-Walter shipyard which was purchased in early May 1918 by the Universal Shipbuilding Company.

She was acquired by the Navy from the United States of America (U.S.) Shipping Board on 24 September 1921 and assigned to the 9th Naval District. She was transferred to the 3rd Naval District in June 1922 and commissioned at Norfolk, Virginia, on 7 June. Later that month, she was turned over to the New York State Naval Militia, on loan, for use as a floating armory at Buffalo, New York. She served New York until 30 January 1928, when she was taken over by the Commandant, 3rd Naval District, for disposal. She was decommissioned and her name was struck from the Navy List on 7 February 1928. On 5 March 1928, her hulk was sold to the Donahue Stratton Co. of Milwaukee, Wisconsin.
