= Piracy around the Horn of Africa =

Maritime piracy in the Middle East

Piracy has taken place in a maritime area bounded by Suez and the Strait of Hormuz, in the region around the Horn of Africa, and waters surrounding the Arabian Peninsula; in the region of the Indian Ocean from the Red Sea through the Arabian Sea to the Gulf of Oman.

Modern-day sea piracy occurs in the region, and has caused international security areas to be declared in the region in the 21st-century. Approximately 35 percent of all crude oil shipped by sea and one-third of all liquefied natural gas pass through the Strait of Hormuz. Such shipments are one of the targets of piracy.

== High Risk Areas (HRA) ==
High Risk Areas for piracy (HRA) have been declared in different parts of the world to reflect precautions to be taken when ships transit them. These include the following:

=== Contact Group of Piracy off the Coast of Somalia (CGPCS) ===
As per the Contact Group of Piracy off the Coast of Somalia (CGPCS), the HRA (updated on 8 October 2015) is an area bounded by the following: In the Red Sea: northern limit: Latitude 15°N, In the Gulf of Oman: northern limit: Latitude 22°N Eastern limit: Longitude 065°E Southern limit: Latitude 5°S.

=== Joint War Committee (JWC) ===
As per the JWC, as of 12 June 2013, in the Indian Ocean, the waters enclosed by: on the North West by the Red Sea, south of Latitude 15° N; on the west of the Gulf of Oman by Longitude 58° E; on the east, Longitude 78° E; and on the south, Latitude 12° S excepting coastal waters of adjoining territories up to 12 nautical miles offshore unless otherwise provided constitute Hull War, Piracy, Terrorism and Related Perils Listed Area.

=== International Bargaining Forum (IBF) ===
The IBF is a forum based in London consisting of two parties, IMEC and ITF Seafarers trust. IMEC, a London-based maritime employers committee consisting primarily of ship managers and manning agents as members, and the London-based ITF (as a representative of worldwide seafarer employee unions) together decide the limits of areas to be designated as war like or extended risk. This has two commercial repercussions. For ship owners, it results in added insurance (H&M and P&I) charged from ships for their transit. For seafarers, it results in additional wages drawn for the duration of their transit in exchange for the higher risk to their lives.

The IBF has designated regions off Africa and Asia under 3 categories, each of which has different commercial implications:

- IBF 'Warlike Operations Area' (off Yemen, in Red Sea), IBF HRA and IBF 'Extended Risk Zones'
- IBF HRA (High risk area) - In West Africa (Gulf of Guinea)
- IBF Extended Risk Zone - off Gulf of Aden and Somalia, up to the center of the Indian Ocean

The above have resulted in the proliferation of floating armouries - ships owned by private military contractors that allows their armed security guards (usually ex defence personnel from UK, France, EU and United States) to be hired by ship owners for a daily hire rate. The austerity moves in western nations since 1990 led to an increase in such private outfits as defence personnel were laid off. The presence of floating armouries in the Indian Ocean has resulted in widespread criticism from neighbouring countries, especially India and Pakistan due to the obvious security concerns and incidents like the Enrica Lexie case. In 2014, the government of Egypt also protested at the IMO that the classifying of their waters as WOA has resulted in hurting their maritime ports.

=== Changes from March 2018 ===
Note: Due to continuous changes, this section may not be up to date

From 1 March 2018, the IBF list of designated risk areas was revised as follows:

- The Warlike Operations Area (WOA) off the north coast of Somalia (former definition 1) was downgraded to a High Risk Area (HRA) and absorbed into definition 2.
- The Yemeni territorial waters (12 NM from mainland) have been upgraded from Extended Risk Zone (ERZ) in the Red Sea and HRA in the Gulf of Aden to WOA. This is the new designation 1 and excludes the Maritime Security Transit Corridor (MSTC).
- The previous upper limit of the ERZ in the Red Sea has been brought south to the Yemen/Saudi Arabia border from the previous coordinates of 20 N.

== Summary ==
A table summarising the risk areas related to piracy is tabulated below.

Area	Agency	Northern Limit	Eastern Limit	Southern Limit	Western Limit	Remarks
HRA	Shipping Industry, Contact Group of Piracy off the Coast of Somalia (CGPCS)	Suez and Strait of Hormuz	65°E	10°S	Eastern Coast of Somalia and other littorals	Promulgated in August 2011, Revised in October 2015
War Risk Area (WRA)	Joint War Committee, London	Red Sea south of 15°N	78°E	12°S	West of Gulf of Oman by 58°E	Promulgated in June 2013 and reviewed in June 2015. Does not include territorial waters of Coastal States unless otherwise mentioned
Warlike Operations Area	International Transport Workers Federation (ITF)/ International Bargaining Forum (IBF)	12 n.m. off Somali North Coast	-	-	-	Promulgation: 1 July 2014
HRA	International Transport Workers Federation (ITF)/ International Bargaining Forum (IBF)	-	Rhiy di-Irisal on Suqutra Island to 14 18°N, 53°E to the coastline at the border between Yemen and Oman, together with a 400-mile zone off the eastern coast of Somalia i.e. from Suqutra Island down to the Kenyan border in the South	-	Coastline at the border of Djibouti and Somalia to 11 48 ° N, 45°E; from 12° N, 45°E to Mayyun Island(Bab-al-Mandap Straits)	Promulgation: ITF (1 April 2011)/ IBF (25 Mar 2011). Excludes Internationally Recognised Transit Corridor (IRTC). Reviewed 1 July 2014
Extended Risk Area	International Transport Workers Federation (ITF); International Bargaining Forum (IBF)	26°N	78°E	10°S	Coastline at the border of Djibouti and Somalia to 11 48 ° N, 45°E; from 12° N, 45°E to Mayyun Island(Bab-al-Mandap Straits)	Promulgation: ITF (1 April 2011)/ IBF (25 Mar 2011). Includes IRTC

== Controversy ==
With the decline of the number of successful and attempted piracy incidents since 2012, the extent and scope of the HRA has increasingly become controversial. This notably concerns whether the territorial waters and EEZ’ of the Western Indian Ocean littorals should be considered part of the HRA.

=== Position of coastal states ===
Littoral states want the scope of the HRA reviewed on account of economic considerations and of the proliferation of arms and ammunition in the HRA.

=== Position of shipping industry ===
The shipping industry assessment in 2015 was that it was too early to revise that scope of the HRA, as revising the HRA could lead to "loss of awareness" in the industry and possible "disengagement" of naval actors.

== Developments ==
=== 2012 ===
==== November ====
At the 12th CGPCS held on 25 July 2012, CGPCS noted the continued reduction in the reach and extent of piracy in the East Arabian Sea, especially east of 70 degrees East, and asked Working Group (WG) 3 to consider a review of the HRA through discussions with industry, the drafters of BMP.

==== December ====
At the 13th CGPCS held on 11 December 2012, CGPCS noted the proposed meeting of a sub-group of WG 3 on 15 January 2013 in London which will include interested Member States and representatives of the insurance and maritime industry to further discuss the issue of the review of existing boundaries of the HRA on an objective and transparent basis taking into account actual incidents of piracy.

=== 2013 ===
==== January ====
At the WG3 ad hoc meeting on HRA on 15 January 2013 at London, Egypt, India, and Oman submitted papers replying to inquiries of the industry and requesting review of the scope of the HRA.

==== May ====
At the 14th CGPCS held on 1 May 2013, it was decided that WG3 will hold another ad hoc meeting on the HRA in the second half 2013 to review the threat assessment by naval forces, any changes in the position of stakeholders, and the possibility of reducing the scope of the HRA.

==== November ====
At the 15th CGPCS Plenary session, the Chair of Working Group 3 (WG3) noted the enduring concern of countries over the scope of the HRA and submitted that the industry desired more time for internal deliberation after the first meeting of a SHADE working group to conduct a threat analysis in December 2013. Several delegations expressed the importance of implementing the convening of an ad hoc meeting to review the scope of HRA before the end of 2013 and expressed regret that the meeting has not been convened. Those delegations expressed their view that the 'extended HRA as outlined in BMPs 3 and 4 does not reflect the reality regarding piracy activity in the Red Sea and some parts of the Indian Ocean'.

=== 2014 ===
==== May ====
At the 16th CGPCS plenary, on 14 May 2014, it was noted that 'the enduring concern of some countries on the scope of the HRA' and 'the fact that the ad hoc meeting to discuss this issue, as agreed to in previous Plenaries, is yet to be held' and it was agreed to convene an ad hoc meeting on the HRA issue just before the 17th Plenary.

==== October ====
A special, ad hoc meeting on the scope of the HRA was convened on 26 October 2014, by the (CGPCS), prior to the 17th Plenary. The meeting agreed that a future meeting on the same subject should be convened by the Chair of the CGPCS by end of Mar 15 to facilitate a recommendation on the review of the scope of the HRA.

=== 2015 ===
==== March ====
On 13 March 2015 an extraordinary meeting of the CGPCS was held to address the issue of the revision of the HRA. several countries called on the industry to review and redraw the High Risk Area from 78° East to 65° East and exclude the Red Sea, the Gulf of Oman and the Exclusive Economic Zone of Pakistan from the HRA. It was agreed to initiate a process to review the HRA based on a threat assessment by the military followed by a risk assessment by the shipping industry.

On 17 March 2015, at a session of the Subcommittee on Security and Defense of the European Parliament, Dr Marcus Houben, stated that the CGPCS was "confident that a solution to this issue will be found within the context of the CGPCS in the near future."

==== October ====
On 8 October 2015, the European Union Chair of the Contact Group of Piracy off the Coast of Somalia (CGPCS) announced a revision of the limits of High Risk Area (HRA). The new limit was placed at 65°E Longitude.

== List of countries seeking review of HRA ==
1. Bangladesh
2. Djibouti
3. Egypt
4. India
5. Indonesia
6. Mauritius
7. Oman
8. Pakistan
9. Qatar
10. Russian Federation
11. Saudi Arabia
12. Seychelles
13. South Africa
14. United Arab Emirates

== See also ==
- CGPCS
- Piracy in Somalia
- Anti-piracy measures in Somalia
- Piracy in the Strait of Malacca
- Piracy in the Gulf of Guinea
