= Mark Gray (Royal Marines officer) =

British Royal Marine

Colonel Mark Gray MBE
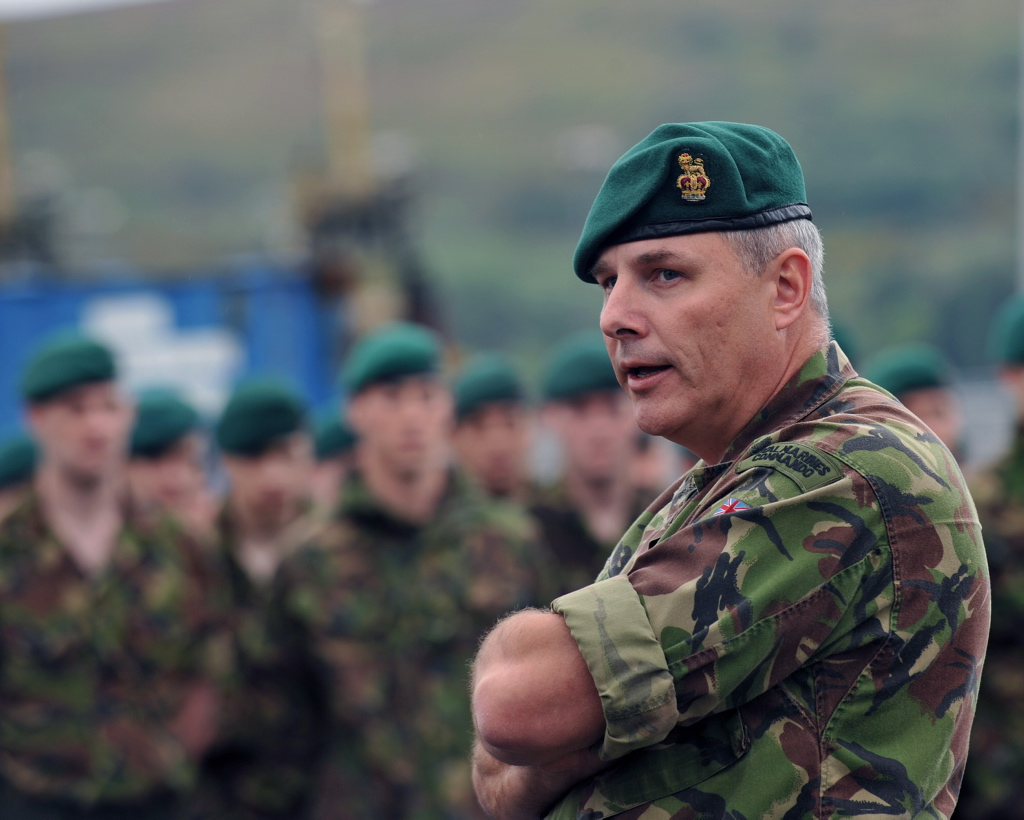
- Mark Gray pictured in 2011 when Commanding Officer of FPGRM
- Born: Weymouth, Dorset
- Military career
- Allegiance: United Kingdom
- Branch: Royal Marines
- Service years: 1984 – 2013
- Rank: Colonel Royal Marines
- Unit: 40 Commando
- Commands: Zulu Company, 45 Commando Royal Marines; FPGRM; Royal Navy Counter-Piracy Task Group 2010
- Conflicts: Operation Haven (Northern Iraq); Operation Banner (Northern Ireland); UNPROFOR (Former Yugoslavia); Operation Tellar (Nicaragua); Operation Highbrow (Beirut); Operation Telic (Iraq); Operation Capri (Somalia); Operation Herrick (Afghanistan)
- Awards: MBE; Order of Duke Domagoj (Croatia)

Mark Nicholas Gray MBE is a former colonel in the British Royal Marines, as of 2021 running a floating armoury company in the ocean area subject to piracy based in Somalia and nearby countries.

As a UN observer he prevented a disaster at the Peruća hydroelectric dam in 1993 during the Croatian War of Independence. The Serbian military raised the level of the lake and placed 30 tons of explosives within the dam in their preparations for withdrawal; detonating the explosives was intended to destroy the dam, which would have released a huge surge of water which would have killed or made homeless 20,000 people. Gray, on his own initiative and exceeding his authority, opened the spillway gate and reduced the level of water in the lake by several metres; when the explosives were detonated the dam did not fail.

== Early life ==
Gray was educated at Bradfield College and Durham University, where he studied Russian. He joined the Royal Marines in 1984 and has seen service in Northern Ireland (Operation Banner), Northern Iraq (Operation Provide Comfort 1991), before being deployed to the former Yugoslavia through UNPROFOR.

== Peruća incident ==
In 1992 Gray, with the rank of major, opened a sluice gate on top of the Peruća dam in Croatia shortly before the occupying Serbs detonated explosives, protected by land mines and booby traps, deep inside it. This action did not become known publicly until described to the Science Festival in 1995 by engineering Professor Paul Back from Oxford University. He described how Serbian militia had expelled UN observers from the 65-metre-high dam in January 1993, and set off huge explosives in a maintenance gallery that ran the dam's length at foundation level. "This was an attempt to use the 540 million cubic metres of stored water as a weapon of mass destruction to the downstream land and population, " said Professor Back. "Some 20,000 people would have been drowned or rendered homeless had the dam failed as intended. " Severe damage was caused to three points in the dam corresponding to where the saboteurs had placed their explosives. In the central section alone it was estimated that 15 tons of explosive material had been used. At each of these three points the top of the dam, made of rock fill with a clay core, sagged by two metres, said Professor Back, who was a member of a British team despatched by the Overseas Development Administration to inspect it and advise on repairs after the Croatians reoccupied it. "During the tenure of the UN observers, but while the dam was in Serb hands, Gray had visited the site and observed that the Serbs were holding the water level well above the correct full supply level, " he said. "On his own initiative, and exceeding his authority, he opened the surface spillway gate sufficiently to slowly reduce the water level. He managed to lower the water level by some metres by the time the attempt to destroy the dam took place. Had he not been able to reduce the level, there is no doubt that the dam would have failed as water would have poured over the slumped crest after the explosions." As it was, Professor Back said it was only a miracle that the dam had not failed. With fighting continuing in the surrounding hills, engineers had to race against time before the ongoing erosion of the dam's clay core caused a blow-through and total collapse. Professor Back said he learned later that Major Gray could have been disciplined for exceeding his authority. "I wrote to the Ministry of Defence and told him he should be given a medal instead." Items of Gray's UN equipment are on display at the Royal Marines Museum.

== After UNPROFOR ==
In 1998, while in command of Z Company, 45 Commando Royal Marines he took part in Operation Tellar, providing relief in Nicaragua in the wake of Hurricane Mitch and in 1999 an exercise in the United States.

He saw service in Iraq (Operation Telic), Beirut (Operation Highbrow), and Somalia (Operation Capri) and Afghanistan (Operation Herrick).

He has had staff appointments at the Permanent Joint Headquarters, Navy Resources and Plans in the Ministry of Defence, the Headquarters of the Multi-National Force – Iraq in Baghdad and the US Joint Chiefs of Staff in The Pentagon (as the deputy CDS liaison officer during the build up and conduct of the 2003 Iraq invasion), at the end of which he was accorded the privilege of addressing both US Houses of Congress, "one of the few Royal Marines to have entered the Capitol Building in uniform since his predecessors burned it down on 24 August 1814 ".

== After Iraq ==
He taught at the Joint Services Command and Staff College, Shrivenham. On promotion to colonel he was appointed to the staff of Fleet Commander Operations, where he was the Head of Operational Policy. He also attended the US Marine Corps Command and Staff College in 1997, graduating with distinction.

He was appointed Commanding Officer Fleet Protection Group Royal Marines in July 2009. In January 2010, the Unit received a counter-piracy award. From September to December 2010 he commanded the Operation Capri Naval Task Group, comprising the ships RFA Fort Victoria, HMS Northumberland and HMS Montrose, with boarding teams from FPGRM, conducting counter-piracy operations in Somali waters. During this time the Task Group captured six pirate teams.

In July 2011 he moved to HQ International Security Assistance Force as the Director, Combined Joint Operations Centre in Afghanistan, where he was the Chief of Current Operations.

== MNG Maritime ==
Upon leaving the Royal Marines in 2013, Gray and fellow Durham alumnus Nick Holtby began MNG Maritime, a UK-based company that provides transfer services to private military and security companies (PMSCs). The company's operations are authorised by specifically issued UK Government trade control licences, covering floating armoury services. It provides offshore storage facilities for weapons used by anti-piracy guards protecting vessels traversing the part of the Indian Ocean known as the "High Risk Area", infested by pirates based in Somalia and other places, so that the weapons do not need to be carried into territorial waters, where being in possession of weapons would be illegal.

== Other ==
He is a qualified PADI scuba diving instructor.

== Honours and awards ==
He was awarded the MBE in the Queen's Birthday Honours 2002, for his part in planning the major UK Armed Forces exercise in Oman in 2001, Exercise Saif Sareea II. In 1995, he featured on the front page of The Times newspaper, being recognised for his role in the incident at the Peruća dam.

On 27 January 2013, on the 20th anniversary of the Peruća incident, Gray was awarded Order of Duke Domagoj by the President of Croatia Ivo Josipović.

The Croatian Radiotelevision filmed a documentary on Gray's involvement in the Peruća Lake dam incident.

- Member of the Order of the British Empire – 2002
- Order of Duke Domagoj - 2013

=== Awards and Campaign Medals ===
| Member of the Order of the British Empire (MBE) |
| General Service Medal with "N. Iraq and S. Turkey" and "Northern Ireland" Clasps |
| UNPROFOR Medal |
| Iraq Medal |
| Operational Service Medal for Afghanistan |
| Queen Elizabeth II Golden Jubilee Medal |
| Queen Elizabeth II Diamond Jubilee Medal |

=== Awards and Campaign Medals, awarded but not authorised for wear ===
| Order of Duke Domagoj |
| Office of the Joint Chiefs of Staff Identification Badge |
| NATO Non-Article V Medal with "Africa" Clasp |
| NATO Non-Article V Medal with "ISAF" Clasp |
