= Bjelaj =

Village in Bosnia and Herzegovina

Bjelaj Бјелај
- Village
- Location within Bosnia and Herzegovina
- Country: Bosnia and Herzegovina
- Entity: Federation of Bosnia and Herzegovina
- Canton: Una-Sana
- Municipality: Bosanski Petrovac

Area
  - Total: 6.54 sq mi (16.94 km^{2})

Population (2013)
  - Total: 96
  - Density: 15/sq mi (5.7/km^{2})
- Time zone: UTC+1 (CET)
  - Summer (DST): UTC+2 (CEST)
- Website: Bosanski Petrovac

Bjelaj (Serbian Cyrillic: Бјелај) is a village in the municipality of Bosanski Petrovac, Federation of Bosnia and Herzegovina, Bosnia and Herzegovina. In the population census of 1991 there lived 569 inhabitants. The Village is dominated by the ruined fortress of Stari Grad Bjelaj.

== Geography ==
Located close to the Čava Mountains (part of the Osječenica) rises from Bjelajsko polje. It is 3 km from the Bosanski Petrovac - Bihać road. There are two springs in Bjelaj, Sinanovac and Madžarac. The collection zone of these springs is Srt (1042 m.), The branch of Osječenica and the ravine Prhovo, on the periphery of Bjelajsko polje, below Osječenica. The springs have their islands that are lost in the fields of the fields (Keljavac). They are used for the water supply system and the surrounding villages.

For inhabitants of the Petrovac area the name Bjelaj refers to all settlements on the southern side of the Bjelajski polje: (Busije Cimeše, Bjelajski Vaganac)

== History ==
=== Medieval ===
The old town of Bjelaj is located on the top of a hill, on a plateau extending in the main north-south direction, about 850 m long. The plateau is divided into the northern, wider and southern, narrow halves equally long. At the southern end of the northern half of the plateau, there is Velika Gradina, an insufficiently explored prehistoric locality from the bronze and iron age from the time of the Illyrians. The southern part of the plateau, much narrower than the north, is in the shape of a lingula. At its northern end is the unexplored prehistoric site of Mala gradina. To the south of it is a large fortress from the medieval period and the Ottoman, Stari grad Bjelaj. Historical unit - Stari grad Bjelaj, declared the National Monument of Bosnia and Herzegovina.

=== Ottoman period ===
The mighty and respectable Beavers' Krajina family in the first half of the rule of Osmanli, Ibrahimpašići, are named after Ibrahim-pasha, Deli-Murat's son. By the middle of the 20th century, there were turbines Deli-Murata in Bjelaj, located about 50 m from Ibrahimpašić's tower. Deli-Murat's son, Ibrahim, who was born at the time his father died and who was educated by Porta, built Ripač, erected a mosque called Ibrahim-pašina mosque, and got possession in Lika (around Lapac), then in Bihać, Ripč, Bjelaj and around today's Bosanski Petrovac. Later, Bećir-beg from Bjelajac (1760-1909) appeared in the vicinity of the Bećir-beg family. At the beginning of the 20th century, this Bey family belonged to those with no representatives and very large land holdings. They had properties in Vranovina, Vodenici, Vedrom Polju, Drinić, and in Bjelaj they owned 752 dunums.

=== Yugoslav era ===
The first elementary school in the town was built of wood and raised by renowned charities Miss Irbi and Johnston. Afterwards, the school was rebuilt, and the second part served as a chapel with a bell tower attached to it. At the site of the overcrowded chapel, the 1925 St. George. Devastated in 1996 during the Bosnian War it was restored in 2006.

=== World War II ===
In World War II, the area was under the rule of the Independent State of Croatia. Several Ustashas came to the village, armed the Muslim Bosniak population, and established a new government. However, the locals surrendered the weapons after mid-August and helped capture the Ustasha. This was the first Muslim site that was liberated in the Bosnian Krajina. When entering the Bjelaj uprisings, no case of violence or other outbreak of the Bosniak population occurred. Communist Party of Yugoslavia had already succeeded in killing a large Serbian uprising that masses of Bosniaks and Croats were not guilty of Ustasha's slaughter. After the liberation of Bjelaj, all measures were taken to place the place an example of the brotherhood and unity of Bosniaks and Serbs in the Bosnian Krajina. However, the Ustashas felt it, attacked the site, captured it and led the entire Muslim population to refuge.

In 1922, Mahmut Ibrahimpašić, a national hero of Yugoslavia, was born. The political commissar of the 5th Krajina (Kozarska Brigade). He was killed on duty on 19 October 1944 in the battle for the liberation of Belgrade. By November of that year, he had already been proclaimed a national hero (among the first Partisan fighters to be so) and the only one from the wider area of Bjelaj.

In 1923, well-known children's writer Ahmet Hromadžić was born, whose works entered the school lecture of some European countries. He was the winner of a large number of literary awards, and as editor in the publishing company "Veselin Masleša" and is the founder of the children's library "Lastavica".

== Demographics ==
According to the 2013 census, its population was 96.

Ethnicity in 2013
Ethnicity	Number	Percentage
Bosniaks	94	97.9%
other/undeclared	2	2.1%
Total	96	100%

== Economy ==
Due to the karst character of the land, farming and cattle breeding are at a low level. In the mid-20th century, the surface digging of bauxite ore began, but the mine was quickly closed due to its inefficiency.
