= Roman roads in Bosnia and Herzegovina =

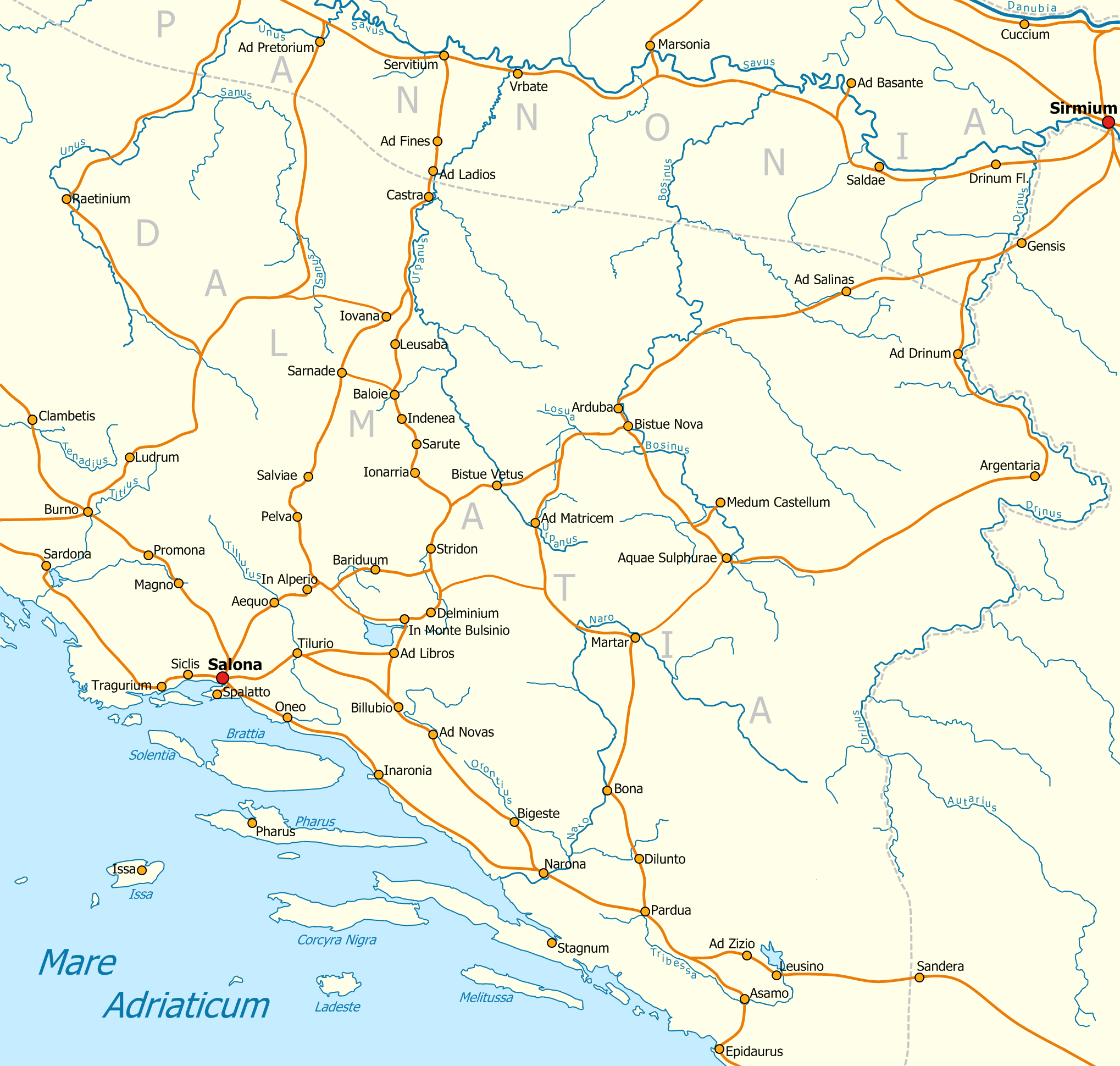
Map of ancient settlements and routes in Bosnia and Herzegovina

Roman roads in Bosnia and Herzegovina and their construction represented the adoption of the values and achievements of Roman civilization (the process of Romanization). The Romans also used waterways for transporting goods or for traveling: the Sava, Drina, Neretva, Vrbas, Bosna, Trebišnjica, Una and their tributaries.

== Roman roads in Bosnia and Herzegovina ==
=== Historical sources ===
Sources for Roman roads are:

- Ptolemy's Geography
- The Solin inscriptions on four slabs that were built into the tower of the cathedral in Split. The inscriptions reveal that during Dolabella's time, five new roads were built in Dalmatia, primarily of a military and later public nature.
- Imperatoris Antonini Augusti Itineraria provinciarum et amrtimum, a road map with stations along the route and distances in Roman miles between them. It is believed to have been created during the reign of Julius Caesar, and revised in the early 3rd century, under the emperor Caracalla. It consists of two parts, the Itinerarium provinciarum, which deals with land routes through the Roman provinces, and the Itinerarium maritimum, which provides evidence of the overseas routes of the Roman Empire.
- Tabula Peutingeriana, which is a graphic sketch in color from Great Britain to India, the directions of which were determined by mapping on the ground. It was made in the form of an elongated map/scroll, which led to the deformation of the geographical forms of land and sea. The north–south space is given very compactly, and the east–west space is very elongated. It is marked with networks of main and secondary roads, settlements, way stations, castles, river courses, mountains and the names of Roman provinces.

The Romans discovered rich mineral deposits in the area of Bosnia and Herzegovina. They soon opened mines of silver, copper, iron, lead, and salt, in the cities of Srebrenica, Srebrenik, Kupres, Olovo, Vareš, Tuzla, etc. For the better and faster development of mining, trade, and ultimately the establishment of their government, they built settlements, military camps, and roads. They expanded road communication from Salona to all parts of Illyricum, and demonstrated the value of machinery in road construction. All this contributed to the Romanization of the population.

=== Road construction ===
As soon as they had finally pacified the inland regions after the Baton's uprising, the Romans began intensive construction and regulation of the road network. The main roads started from Salona and Narona. The basic network of roads was built mostly during the reign of Emperor Tiberius (reigned from 14 to 37 AD), who, as the commander of the legions at the time of Baton's uprising, got to know Illyricum well.

The construction of the roads was accompanied by a large number of guardhouses and road stations for security and maintenance purposes. With them came peace (Pax Romana) that would last for several centuries, which would enable more comprehensive economic and cultural progress. The roads were built by members of the VII. and XI. legions with the help of the local population. These were well-made roads that would continue to be in use long after the Romans left. Traces and a number of milestones are still visible to this day as the most authentic evidence of the existence of the roads. The main roads started from Salona and Narona.

The first significant roads built were:

- The Salona – Narona – Leusinium road is part of the great imperial communication from Aquileia to Dyrrachium, and Durrës and Constantinople. It passed for the most part through present-day Dalmatia, and through Herzegovina through Ljubuško polje – the station of Bigeste, where a regional Roman road branched off to the northeast, and via Brotnjo descended to Bišće polje and Mostar. From Čapljina the road led via Stolac (Diluntum) to Panik on Trebišnjica (Leusinium), and further via Nikšić to Shkodra.
- Narona - Stolac (Diluntum) - Nevesinje - Konjic - Ilidža (Aquae Sulphurae), may have begun to be built during the reign of Octavian, judging by the discovery of a milestone with the inscription Divo Augusto, from the Trešanica valley near Konjic. Here it met the road from the direction of Hedum, and continued to Srebrenica.

==== Dolabella ====
The construction of the roads was begun by Publius Cornelius Dolabella, who was appointed governor of the province of Dalmatia by Octavian Augustus in 14 AD. After Octavian died soon after, Dolabella was Tiberius' imperial legate. Dolabella finished his governorship of Dalmatia in 20 AD. After that, he was proconsul of the senatorial province of Africa in 23 and 24 AD, where he successfully brought the war with the Numidian and Mauritanian tribes to an end.

Based on epigraphic monuments from Salona, it can be seen that Dolabella was responsible for the construction of four road routes with a total length of 600 km, built in just six years, which represents one of the largest construction projects in the history of the Western Balkans. Dolabella also dedicated himself to many other infrastructure works in the coastal cities of Cavtat (Epidaurum) and Zadar (Iader).

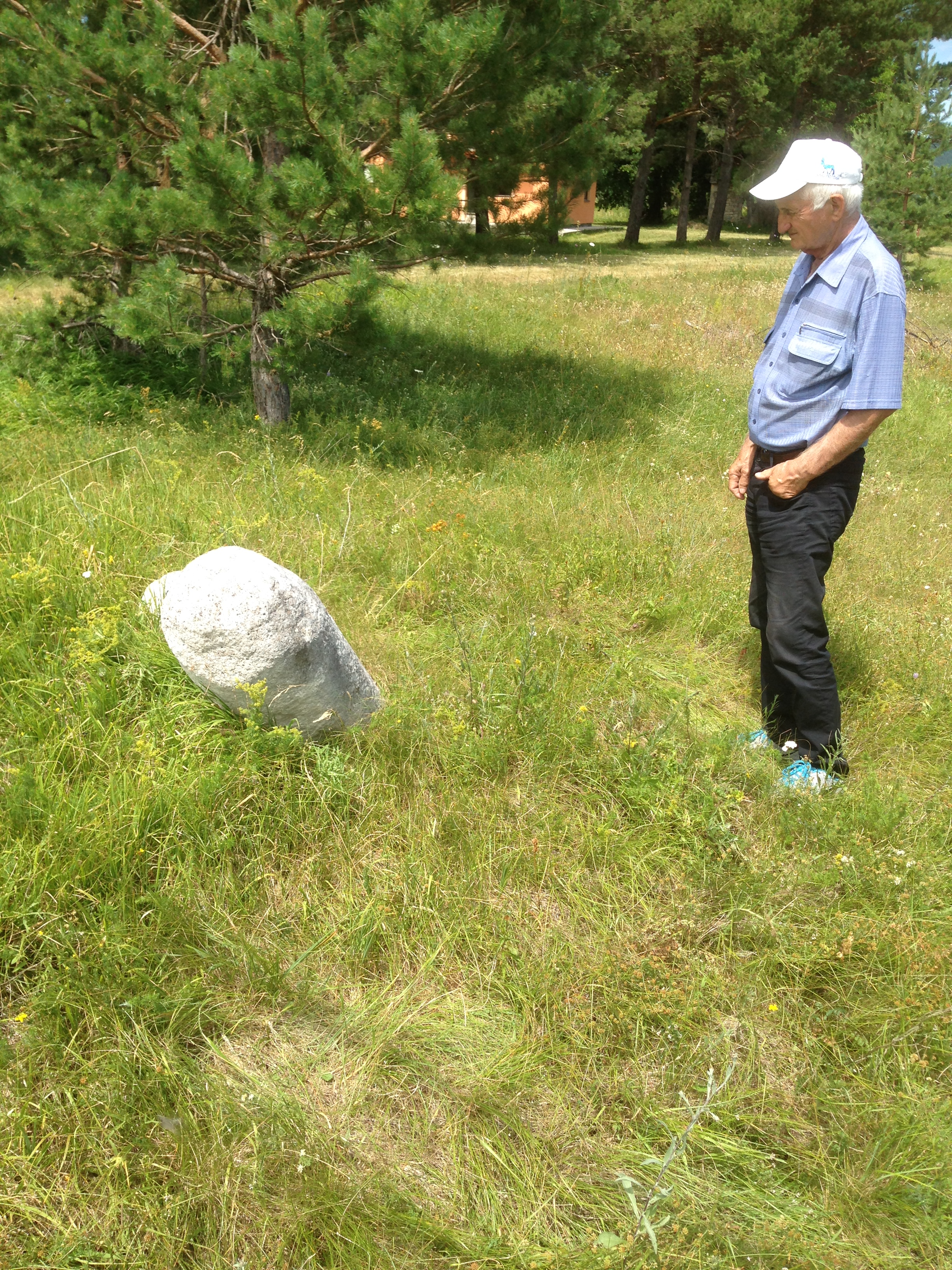
Milestone in the village of Bara near Bosanski Petrovac

- Salona - Knin - Bosansko Grahovo - Uilice mountain, 77.5 Roman miles long. Later this road would be extended along the route Drvar - Bosanski Petrovac - Sana valley - Una valley - Sisak. In Petrovac field, in the village of Bara, there was a road station and crossroads, with a later built branch of the road towards Bihać near Osječenica, and another to Bosanska Krupa via Krnjeuša.
- Salona-Livanjsko polje-Glamočko polje-Bosanska Gradiška near Servicia on the Sava, in a length of 167 Roman miles.
- Salona (from Sinj)-Kupres-Sarajevo valley, to the Daesitiates castle He(...?) of 156 Roman miles. The road was later extended via Romanija to Srebrenica (Domavia).
- Salona (from Sinj)-Kupres- the Bosna river (Bathinus), which divides the Breucas and Oseriates, 158 Roman miles long. The route of this road has not been determined. One version is that it was the same road to Travnik that went to Hedum, where it branched off and ended in present-day Zenica, while others believe that the end of the road was further north, towards the border of Pannonia and Dalmatia.

==== Territorial demarcations ====
The construction of roads was accompanied by the creation of cadastral maps that served to determine the boundaries between individual urban and rural areas (boundary inscriptions and the Dolabellian form). With this, the Roman government, determining the exact boundaries of certain communities that have the right to dispose of a certain territory, determined the areas of legal responsibility of administrative and self-governing bodies and officials, and established the framework of a comprehensive cadastre. The latter had a special meaning: it encouraged the native population to accept the Roman system of land ownership, which is a crucial step in the process of abandoning local traditions and customs (Romanization).

=== Ostale ceste ===
- Narona-Popovo polje-Cavtat.
- A Roman road led from Epidaurus (Cavtat) into the interior of the Balkans. It passed through Trebinje (Asamo), Mosko (Ad Zizio), Panik (Leusinium), Bileća, Gacko, Foča and Pljevlja (Municipium S...), and via Prijepolje led to Novi Pazar, where it connected to the local Roman road system.
- The road through the Drina valley connected Sirmium with the lead and silver mines on the Drina. A connecting road through the Saska river valley connected it with the mining center in Domavija. The Podrinje communication continued south from Skelani towards Višegrad.

=== Method of construction ===
The roads were usually 3.5, up to 4 m wide, where two rounds could be passed, while on the rocky widths it was about 1 to 1.5 m. On individual paths, there are differences in construction, where three layers were established: the basis of the road, the elastic nucleus and the superficial prison. They were eaten as simpler and shorter as possible across the mountainous areas, and embankments and notch were avoided. If there was a steep side, the retaining wall was made.

Over time, the roads upgraded, expanded, and also systematized, where new roads were made in mountainous areas. At the roads, road cells were built (Mansiones, Mutationes, Tabernae) that had the task of taking care of security and maintenance.
