= Jasenovac, Croatia =

Jasenovac, Croatia may refer to:

- Jasenovac, Sisak-Moslavina County, a town and municipality in Croatia, the location of the Jasenovac concentration camp
- Jasenovac, Osijek-Baranja County, a village in the Kneževi Vinogradi municipality in Croatia
- Jasenovac Zagorski, a village in the Krapinske Toplice municipality in Croatia

== See also ==
- Jasenovac (disambiguation)
