= Jasen =

Jasen may refer to:

== People ==
- Jasen (name)
- Jasen Mesić (born 1972), Croatian politician
- Karima Jasen

== Places ==
- Jasen, Domžale, a village in the Municipality of Domžale, central Slovenia
- Jasen, Ilirska Bistrica, a village in the Municipality of Ilirska Bistrica, southwestern Slovenia
- Jasen (Ilidža), a village in Bosnia and Herzegovina
- Jasen (Trebinje), a village in Bosnia and Herzegovina
- Jasen, Montenegro
- Jasen (reserve), a nature reserve in Macedonia

== See also ==
- Jasenov (disambiguation)
