= Brestovac =

Brestovac (Serbo-Croatian for "Elm tree") may refer to:

- Brestovac, Croatia, a village and a municipality in Požega-Slavonia County
- Brestovac, Bojnik, Serbia
- Brestovac, Bor, Serbia
- Brestovac, Knić, Serbia
- Brestovac, Leskovac, Serbia
- Brestovac, Negotin, Serbia
- Bački Brestovac, Serbia
- Banatski Brestovac, Serbia
- Brestovac, Orahovac, Kosovo
- Brestovac, Bosanski Petrovac, Bosnia and Herzegovina
- Daruvarski Brestovac, Croatia
- Garešnički Brestovac, Croatia
- Brestovăț, Romania

== See also ==
- Brestova
- Brestovo (disambiguation)
- Brestovik
