= Jasenovac (disambiguation) =

Jasenovac may refer to:

- Jasenovac concentration camp, a World War II concentration camp
- Jasenovac, Sisak-Moslavina County, a town and municipality in Croatia, the location of the Jasenovac concentration camp
- Jasenovac, Bosanski Petrovac, a village in the Una-Sana Canton in Bosnia and Herzegovina
- Jasenovac, Osijek-Baranja County, a village in the Kneževi Vinogradi municipality in Croatia
- Jasenovac Zagorski, a village in the Krapinske Toplice municipality in Croatia
- Mali Jasenovac, a village near Zaječar, Serbia
- Veliki Jasenovac, a village near Zaječar, Serbia

== See also ==
- Jasenov (disambiguation)
- Jasenovo (disambiguation)
