= Smoljana =

Smoljana may refer to:

- Boloria, a butterfly genus in the family Nymphalidae
- Smoljana, Bosanski Petrovac, a village near Bosanski Petrovac
