= Yasenovo =

Yasenovo (Ясеново) may refer to:

- Yasenovo, Burgas Province, a village in Burgas Province, Bulgaria
- Yasenovo, Stara Zagora Province, a village in Stara Zagora Province, Bulgaria

== See also ==
- Yasenevo
- Jasenov
