= Bjelaj Fortress =

Medieval town-fortress complex in Bosnia and Herzegovina

- Bjelaj, Una-Sana Canton; Bosnia and Herzegovina
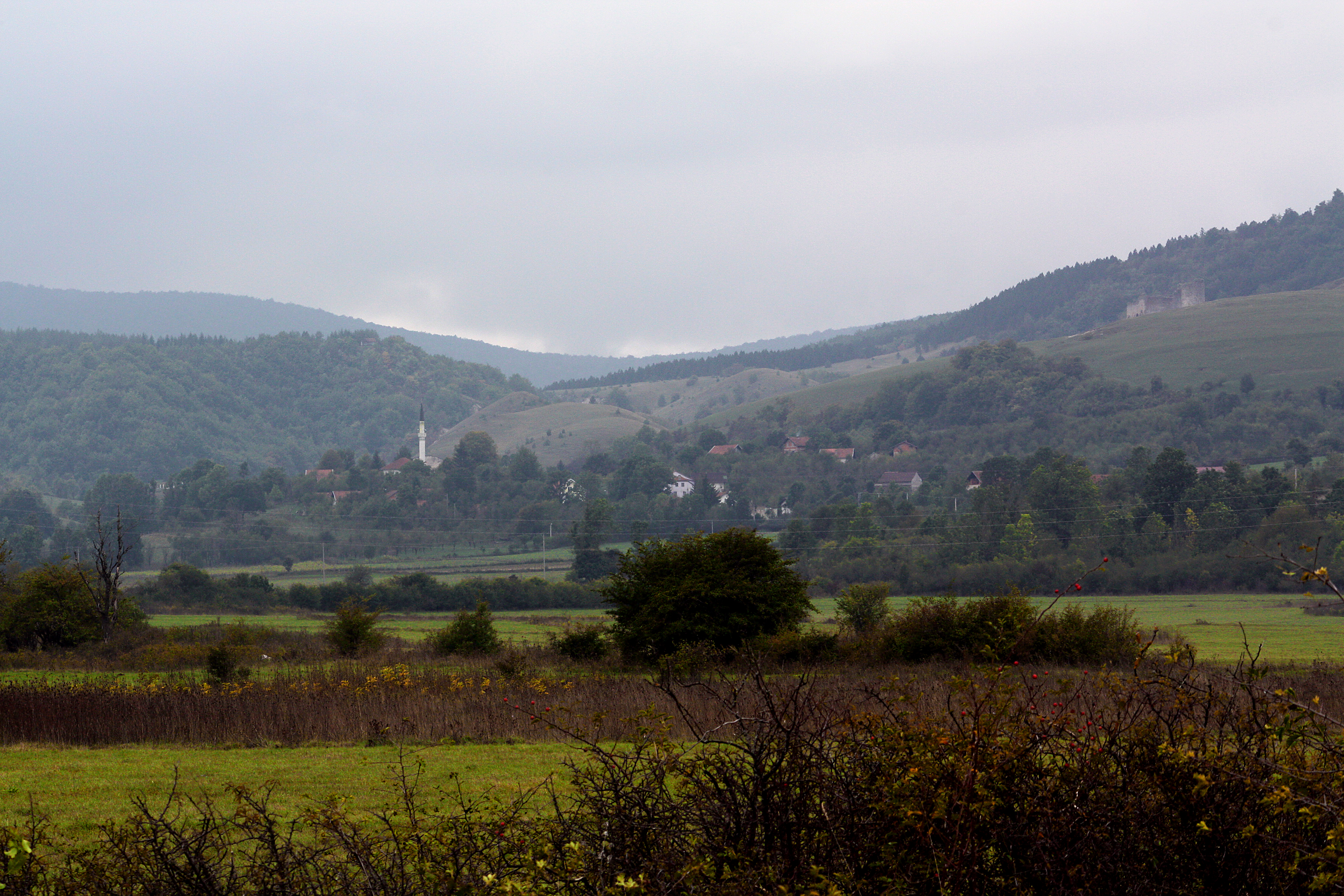
- Bjelaj Fortress (Top right hand corner)

Site information
- Type: Hilltop castle
- Owner: The Government of Bosnia and Herzegovina
- Controlled by: Vladislaus II May 1495 to at least 1505; Kingdom of Hungary (1301–1526), Ottoman Empire (-1878); Austria-Hungary (1878–1918)
- Condition: Repaired (Protected as National Monument of Bosnia and Herzegovina)

Location
- Coordinates: 44.5832°N 16.1987°E

Site history
- Built: 15th century
- Built by: (unknown)
- In use: until at least 1833
- Materials: hewn stone (ashlar)
- Battles/wars: Ottoman siege

Garrison information
- Garrison: 30 Men (1747)

Bjelaj Fortress, locally known as Stari Grad Bjelaj (Bjelaj old town), is a medieval town-fortress complex near the village of Bjelaj, Bosanski Petrovac, Bosnia and Herzegovina.

== Location ==
Located on the edge of the Petrovac plain (or part thereof Bjelajsko fields), on the northern slope of the Osječenica mountain. The area around the city is uninhabited and lean. The whole complex is situated on a plateau about 850 metres (2,790 ft) long.

== History ==
On the south end of the northern half, there is a great fort, a prehistoric site from the Bronze and Iron Age. On the north end, there is a small fort. The fort itself has two parts: a medieval southern and northern Ottoman part. The medieval town has a ground plan of an irregular rectangle over 40 meters long and a width of about 35 meters. From the tower on the west side is the beginning of the remains of a large pen that was added along with the medieval city in the Ottoman period.

First mentioned in written sources in 1495 and named after the whiteness (or tint) by which it stood out above Bjelajsko field. Ownership is attributed to Vladislaus II’s Treasurer, who in 1495 is recorded paying to Gašpar Perušić the sum of 30 forints "to preserve his city of Belaj" (egregio Caspar Perusyth pro conservatione castri sui Belay dati sunt 30 fl.). This clearly shows the settlement was defended by this point. Ten years later, in 1505 had most of the city together with the Sokolac fortress and Ripač by Princess Beatrice Frankopan, limbs Duke Johannes Corvinus, and is in her name all three cities managed kaštelan Dujam Orlovčić.

Between 1530 and 1537, Bjelaj (Bilaj) came under Ottoman rule, becoming part of the Sanjak of Bosnia, the villagers and the cadillac Neretva. Already in 1540, it is mentioned for the first time on Bjelaj nahija, and later it is mentioned as Nahija Bjelaj-Blagaj, but soon falls under the cadiluk Kamengrad, which is mentioned as a cadil in the Bosnian or Klis sandbag. From 1562, Nađija Bjelaj was connected to the cadillac Novosel, who was in the cliché sandžak. It was noted that in 1577 a crew of 370 Ottoman mercenaries was placed in the fortress under the dizdar command. From 1592, the city was part of the Bihac captaincy, and from the 18th century to the composition of the Petrovac captaincy. Dizdar Bjelaj (Bilaja) Alijaga was in the demining commission with the Republic of Venice. In 1747 in Bjelaj there was a crew of 30 members and Dizdar Hasanag. According to the list of fortifications and weapons in them from 1833, in Bjelaj (Bilaj) there was 1 top of 12 pedals and 3 small canopies of 6 pedals.

== Description ==
Old town Bjelaj (Bilaj) has two parts: the southern medieval and northern Ottoman part. The medieval city has a layout of irregular rectangles over 40 m long (north-south) and about 35 m wide (east-west). The entrance to the city is in the northward.

=== Medieval part ===
It is half-closed, with partially preserved arches and doorways. In the northwest corner, there is a massive round tower 2/3 off the ramparts, about 16 m high. The entrance to the tower is at a height of about 4 m above the current level of the land. According to the outer form, it is assumed that the inside of the tower was divided into three levels: the ground floor or basement, the level at the entrance level, and the space above the entrance because the ceiling can be seen on the canvas wall continuously. East of the entrance are the remains of a narrow, hollow, heavily walled area as high as the ramparts (15-16m). That space was built up beside the rampart. Only the upper part of it was preserved and probably served for the rise of soldiers to the top of the wall on which they were coarse, and sometimes small loopholes. On the ground are the remains of the eastern part of the longitudinal wall that forms a whole with the vertical rest of the described wall beside the wall. These remains of a wall on the ground share the easternmost part of the interior of the city from the west. After a few meters they are lost to the south, and on the west side towards the tower, they do not see traces. The impression is that it was part of some enclosure that protected the penetration into the city. The western side of the city was harder defensive because the enemy could draw from the back. The western ramparts are therefore monolithic and end up with clods, of which only a very small part has been preserved. Beneath the level of the chestnut tree, there are a number of stone consoles on the top of the ramparts that served as a wooden backbone. Below them is a series of shorter brackets embedded in a rampart. The eastern rampart was facing Bjelaysko polje. On it are 4 large loopholes semi-rounded. and on the west side towards the tower, they do not see traces. The impression is that it was part of some enclosure that protected the penetration into the city. The western side of the city was harder defensive because the enemy could draw from the back. The western ramparts are therefore monolithic and end up with clods, of which only a very small part has been preserved. Beneath the level of the chestnut tree, there are a number of stone consoles on the top of the ramparts that served as a wooden backbone. Below them is a series of shorter brackets embedded in a rampart. The eastern rampart was facing Bjelaysko polje. On it are 4 large loopholes semi-rounded. and on the west side towards the tower, they do not see traces. The impression is that it was part of some enclosure that protected the penetration into the city. The western side of the city was harder defensive because the enemy could draw from the back. The western ramparts are therefore monolithic and end up with clods, of which only a very small part has been preserved. Beneath the level of the chestnut tree, there are a number of stone consoles on the top of the ramparts that served as a wooden backbone. Below them is a series of shorter brackets embedded in a rampart. The eastern rampart was facing Bjelaysko polje. On it are 4 large loopholes semi-rounded. The western ramparts are therefore monolithic and end up with clods, of which only a very small part has been preserved. Beneath the level of the chestnut tree, there are a number of stone consoles on the top of the ramparts that served as a wooden backbone. Below them is a series of shorter brackets embedded in a rampart. The eastern rampart was facing Bjelaysko polje. On it are 4 large loopholes semi-rounded. The western ramparts are therefore monolithic and end up with clods, of which only a very small part has been preserved. Beneath the level of the chestnut tree, there are a number of stone consoles on the top of the ramparts that served as a wooden backbone. Below them is a series of shorter brackets embedded in a rampart. The eastern rampart was facing Bjelaysko polje. On it are 4 large loopholes semi-rounded.

They are designed to shoot from a wooden or stone platform in a standing position. On some of them, the vertical and horizontal, nicely carved stone blocks and slabs that were used as frames are still on the inside of the ramparts. Above the loophole is a horizontal array of holes for the ceiling beams above which there are stone consoles. From the ramparts, there is a view of the entire Bjelas field and the surrounding area. The southern slum is completely demolished. Towards the tower next to the western ramparts is the remains of the tank. The fortresses and towers of an older fortress were built of travertine blocks and broken stone. In front of the northern rampart and entrance to the old part of the city, there is a ditch that is saturated, but its contours can be identified.

=== Ottoman part ===
From the tower on the west side are the remains of a large patch which was built alongside the medieval city in the Ottoman era. The precinct is located north of the older part of the city, almost regular in a four-legged shape, 110 m long, about 40 m wide. Only parts of the western ramparts are preserved, up to a height of 2 m. According to the material, they are completely different from the walls of the medieval city. They were built from a finely broken stone blended with plenty of plaster. There was a small mosque in the backyard. Today, at its place, the hollow is filled with a bunch of stones. The entrance to the pavement was on the north wall. He was overwhelmed by a "shaggy bow". In this place, the overhead remains of the ramparts are barely visible or only its traces. The most well-preserved part of the Ottoman times is south and north of the medieval trench, along with the west side of the plateau. At the end of one section of the western ramparts, another entry appeared to be in that wall north of the ditch. Along the eastern side of the fortress is not preserved.

== Current state ==
On-site inspection in February 2007, found that the medieval city was still quite well preserved, while only parts of the western wall remained from the Ottoman peninsula. In the walls of the medieval city, the holes from which the stone was taken were seen. It is exposed to deterioration due to neglect, lack of maintenance and absence of an appropriate management plan.

Today Old town Bjelaj is located in the contact zone with the National Park "Una", and in 2007 it was declared a national monument of Bosnia and Herzegovina.
