= Brestovo =

Brestovo refers to the following places:

== Bosnia and Herzegovina ==
- Brestovo (Stanari)

== Bulgaria ==
- Brestovo, Blagoevgrad Province
- Brestovo, Lovech Province

== Serbia ==
- Brestovo (Despotovac)
- Brestovo (Novi Pazar)
- Brestovo (Vladičin Han)
