= Čret =

Čret may refer to:

- Čret, Slovenia, also known as Gornji Lenart, a village near Brežice
- Čret, Croatia, a village near Krapinske Toplice
