= Kolonić =

Kolonić may refer to

- Kolunić, a village in Bosnia and Herzegovina
- Leopold Karl von Kollonitsch, otherwise Kolonić, (1631–1707), a Cardinal Archbishop of the Austrian Empire
