= Klenovac =

Klenovac may refer to:

- Klenovac, Serbia, a village near Zaječar
- Klenovac, Bosanski Petrovac, a village near Bosanski Petrovac
- Klenovac, Croatia, a village near Perušić
