= Tkalčević =

Tkalčević is a Croatian surname.

In Croatia, they are mostly from the environs of Krapina, but today it is chiefly found in Zagreb, followed by Čreta with the Krapina area, Bilje, Zabok and Zleć. Some of its members have emigrated to Australia, the United States, Argentina, Canada and Germany.

It may refer to:

- Adolfo Veber Tkalčević (1825–1889), philologist and politician
- Igor Tkalčević (1974–), professional footballer

== Bibliography ==
- Moj.hr (n.d.). "Prezime Tkalčević". Acta Croatica (in Croatian).
