= Petrovac, Bosnia and Herzegovina =

Municipality in Bosnia and Herzegovina

Petrovac Петровац
- Municipality
- Seal

- Location of Petrovac within Republika Srpska

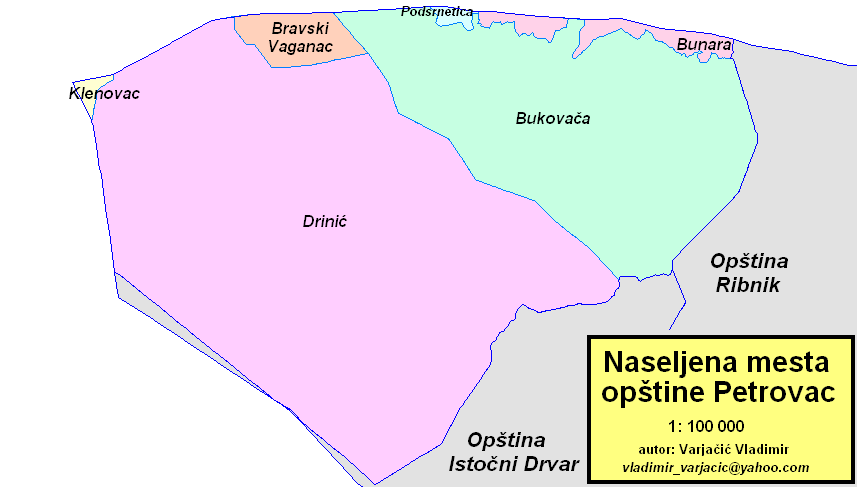
- Coordinates: 44°30′N 16°28′E
- Country: Bosnia and Herzegovina
- Entity: Republika Srpska
- Geographical region: Bosanska Krajina

Government
  - Municipal mayor: Drago Kovačević (SNSD)

Area
  - Total: 154.9 km^{2} (59.8 sq mi)

Population (2013 census)
  - Total: 361
  - Density: 2.33/km^{2} (6.04/sq mi)
- Time zone: UTC+1 (CET)
  - Summer (DST): UTC+2 (CEST)
- Area code: 51
- Website: www.drinic.rs.ba

Petrovac (Serbian Cyrillic: Петровац) is a municipality in Republika Srpska, Bosnia and Herzegovina. It is situated in the western part of Republika Srpska and the central part of the Krajina region. Petrovac was created from a small part of the pre-war municipality of Bosanski Petrovac, whose remaining portion kept the original name and is a part of the Federation of Bosnia and Herzegovina. The municipality seat is the village of Drinić.

== Geography ==
Petrovac is a rural municipality, consisting of villages Bunara, Drinić and Podsrnetica and parts of Bravski Vaganac, Bukovača, and Klenovac. It is located between municipalities of Bosanski Petrovac in the north and west, Ribnik and Istočni Drvar in the east, and Drvar in the south. The total area of the municipality is 137 km^{2}, about a sixth of 853 km^{2} of the pre-war municipality.

== History ==
Petrovac was created in 1995 following the end of the Bosnian War. As of 2019, it is one of the smallest municipalities by number of inhabitants in Republika Srpska.

== Demographics ==
=== Population ===
Population of settlements – Petrovac municipality
	Settlement	1991.	2013.
	Total		361
1	Drinić	363	336

=== Ethnic composition ===
Ethnic composition – Petrovac municipality
	2013.
Total	361 (100,0%)
Serbs	358 (99,17%)
Bosniaks	2 (0,554%)
Montenegrins	1 (0,277%)

== See also ==
- Municipalities of Republika Srpska
