= Zdravko Čelar =

Yugoslav partisan (1917–1942)

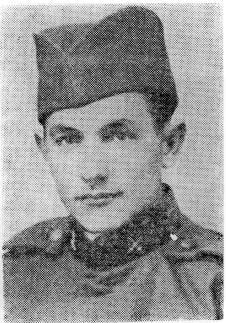
- Born: 15 September 1917; Rašinovac near Bosanski Petrovac, Austro-Hungary
- Died: July 1942 (aged 25); Rakovac near Srbac, Independent State of Croatia
- Military career
- Conflicts: World War II in Yugoslavia: Drvar uprising

Zdravko Čelar (Serbian: Здравко Челар; Rašinovac near Bosanski Petrovac, 15 September 1917 – Rakovac near Srbac, July 1942), was a Yugoslav partisan, posthumously awarded with Order of the People's Hero.

Village Čib in Vojvodina was renamed Čelarevo in his honor after World War II.

== Sources ==
- Lukač, Dušan (1967). Ustanak u Bosanskoj Krajini [Uprising in the Bosnian Krajina] (in Serbo-Croatian). Belgrade, Yugoslavia: Vojnoizdavački Zavod. OCLC 494388127.
