= Jasenov =

Jasenov may refer to:

- Jasenov, Humenné District, a village in Slovakia
  - Jasenov Castle
- Jasenov, Sobrance District, a village in Slovakia
- Jasenov Del, a village in Babušnica, Serbia

== See also ==
- Jasen (disambiguation)
- Jasenová
- Jasenové
- Jasenovo (disambiguation)
- Jasenovce
- Jasenovac (disambiguation)
