= Jovan Bijelić =

Serbian painter (1884–1964)

- Born: 30 June [O.S. 19 June] 1884; Revenik, Bosnia and Herzegovina, Austria-Hungary
- Died: 12 March 1964 (aged 79); Belgrade, Yugoslavia
- Occupation: painter
- Awards: Order of Labour, October award,

Jovan Bijelić (Serbian Cyrillic: Јован Бијелић (30 June [O.S. 19 June] 1884 – 12 March 1964) was an important painter and academic born in Revenik (village Kolunić in Smiljani) close to present-day Bosanski Petrovac. As of 1919 he moved from Bihać to Belgrad where he started to work as a scenograph and painter in the National Theater. Bijelić was one of the most important representatives of the Yugoslav color expressionism in the 1930s as well as on the founders of the Belgrade based artistic Group "OBLIK" alongside Branko Popović and Petar Palavičini. The Department of Fine Arts and Music of the Serbian Academy of Sciences in Belgrade elected Bijelić as a full member on 5 December 1963.

Bijelić is included on The 100 most prominent Serbs list.

== Gallery ==
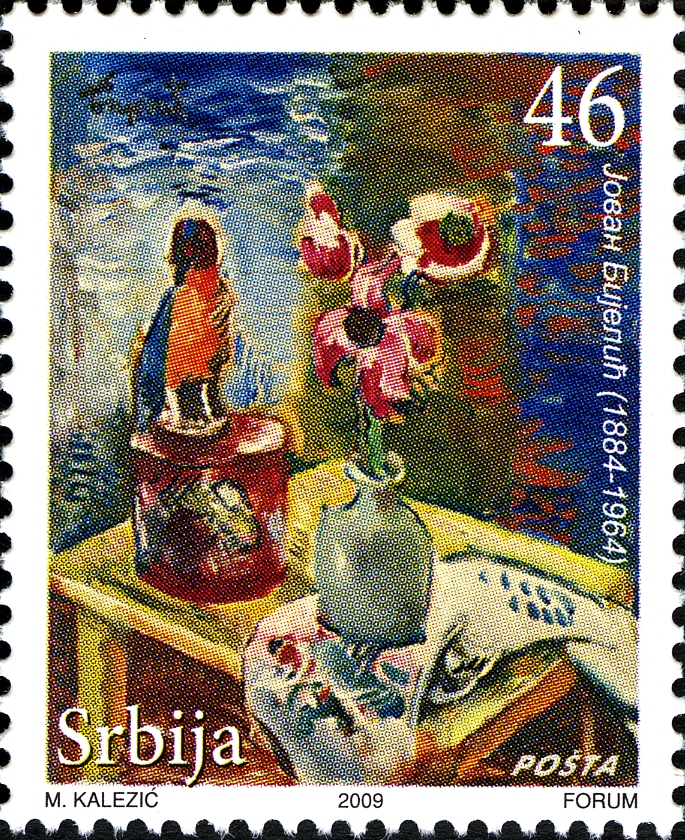

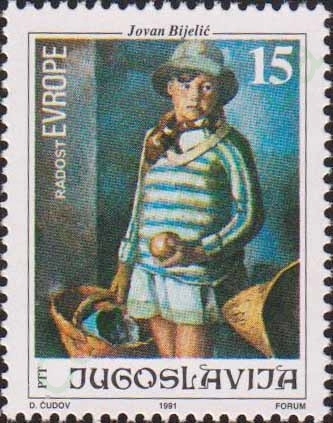

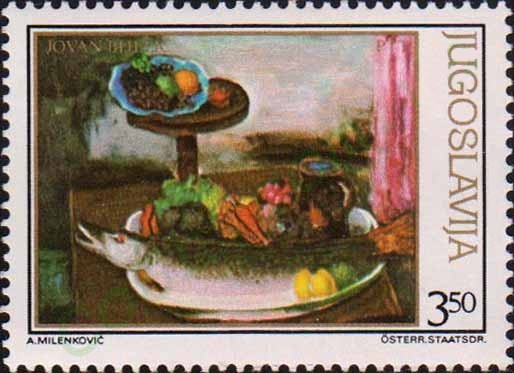

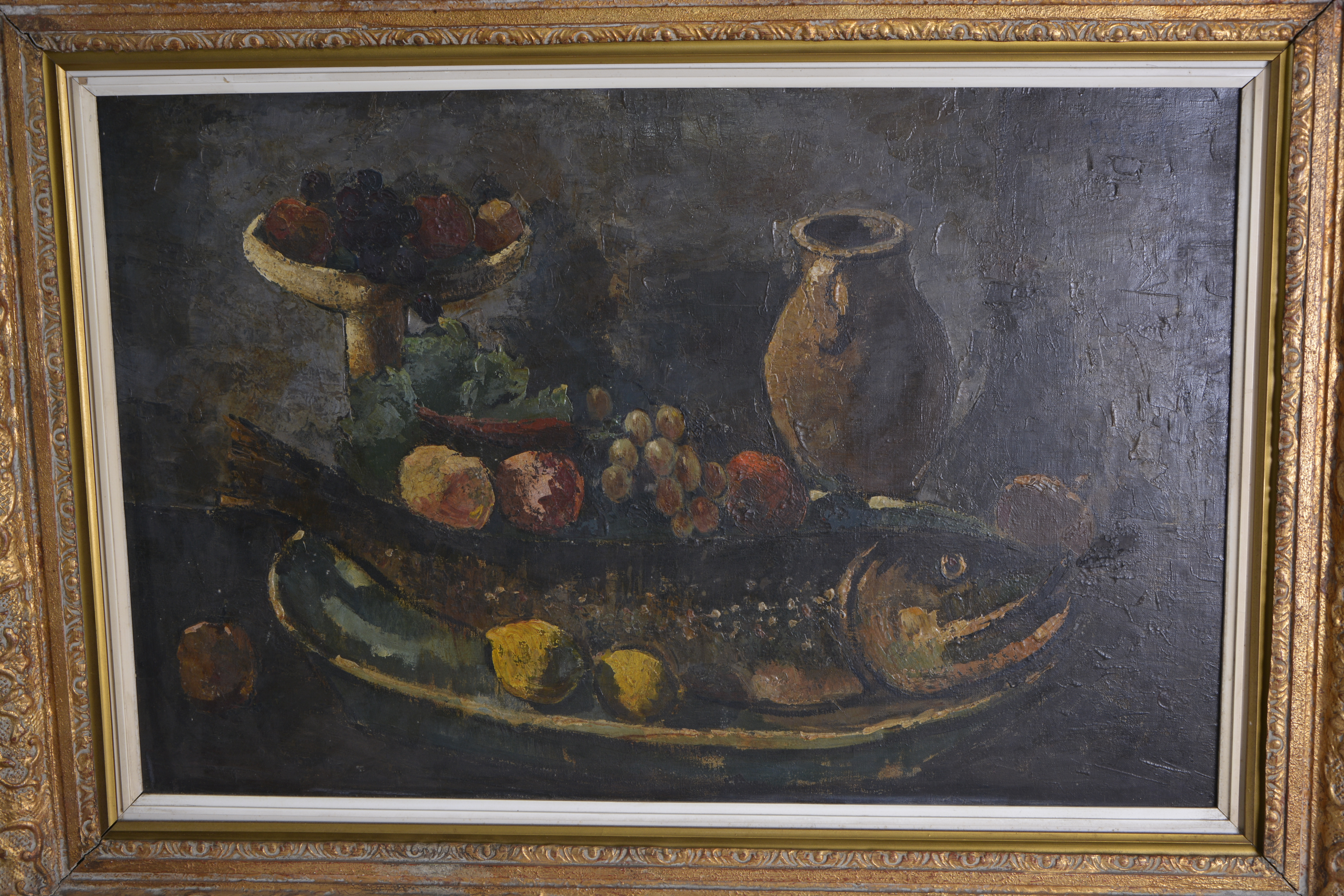
