= Kapljuh =

Kapljuh Капљух
- Village
- Location within Bosnia and Herzegovina
- Coordinates: 44°34′04″N 16°26′52″E
- Country: Bosnia and Herzegovina
- Entity: Federation of Bosnia and Herzegovina
- Canton: Una-Sana
- Municipality: Bosanski Petrovac

Area
  - Total: 3.76 sq mi (9.75 km^{2})

Population (2013)
  - Total: 27
  - Density: 7.2/sq mi (2.8/km^{2})
- Time zone: UTC+1 (CET)
  - Summer (DST): UTC+2 (CEST)

Kapljuh (Serbian Cyrillic: Капљух) is a village in the municipality of Bosanski Petrovac, Bosnia and Herzegovina.

== Demographics ==
According to the 2013 census, its population was 27, all Serbs.
