= Bunara =

Bunara Бунара
- Village
- Location within Bosnia and Herzegovina
- Coordinates: 44°32′N 16°35′E
- Country: Bosnia and Herzegovina
- Entity: Federation of Bosnia and Herzegovina
- Canton: Una-Sana
- Municipality: Bosanski Petrovac

Area
  - Total: 2.46 sq mi (6.38 km^{2})

Population (2013)
  - Total: 39
  - Density: 16/sq mi (6.1/km^{2})
- Time zone: UTC+1 (CET)
  - Summer (DST): UTC+2 (CEST)

Bunara (Serbian Cyrillic: Бунара) is a village in the municipality of Petrovac, Republika Srpska, Bosnia and Herzegovina.

== Demographics ==
According to the 2013 census, its population was 39, all Serbs.
