= Krapinske Toplice =

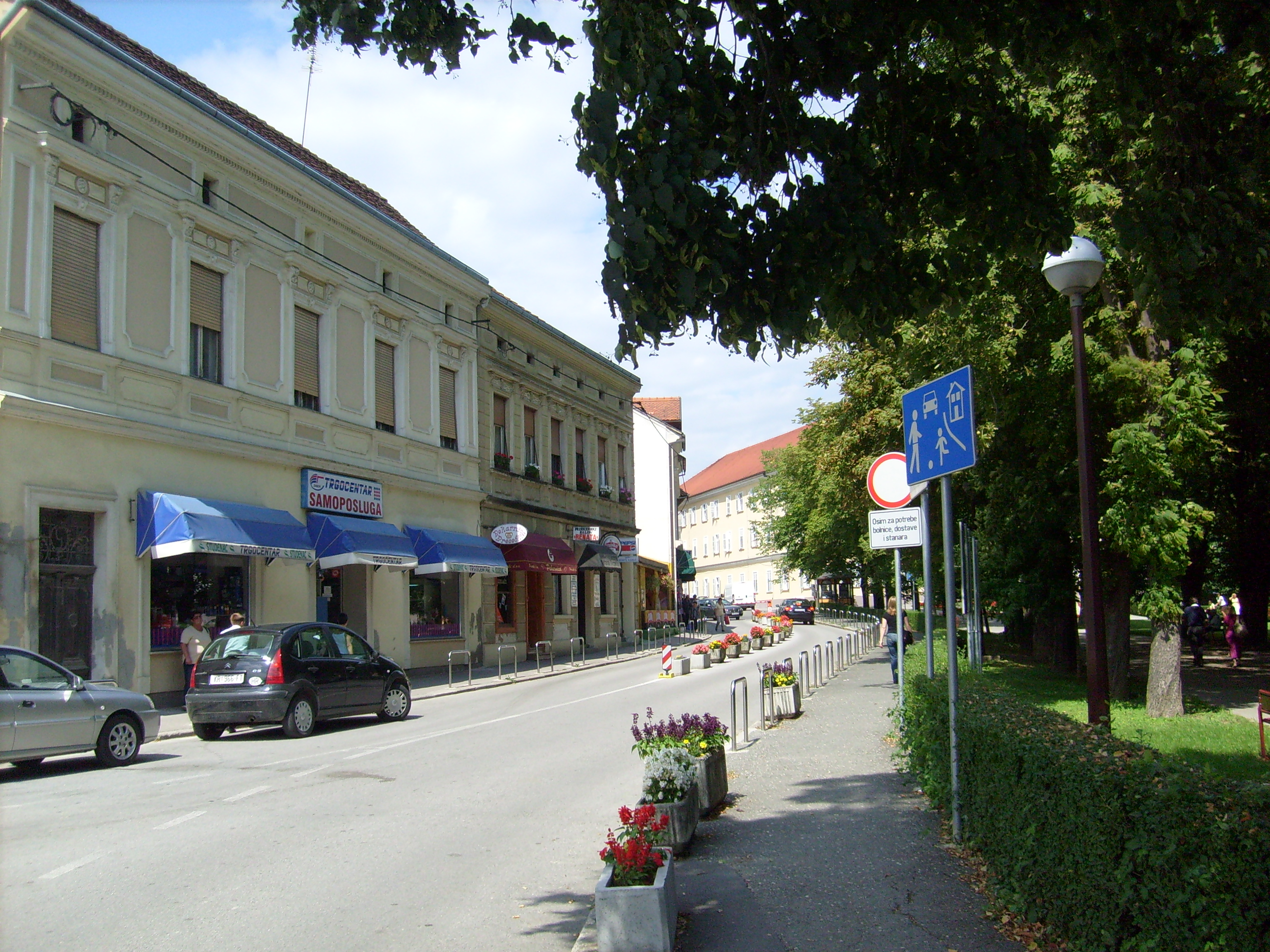

- Location within Croatia
- Coordinates: 46°06′N 15°51′E
- Country: Croatia
- County: Krapina-Zagorje County

Government
  - Mayor: Gordana Jureković (SDP)

Area
  - Total: 48.8 km^{2} (18.8 sq mi)

Population (2021)
  - Total: 4,827
  - Density: 98.9/km^{2} (256/sq mi)
- Time zone: UTC+1 (CET)
  - Summer (DST): UTC+2 (CEST)
- Website: krapinske-toplice.hr

Krapinske Toplice is a village and municipality in Krapina-Zagorje County in Croatia.

== History ==
No remains of people or artifacts from the Paleolithic era, were found on the territory of the Municipality, but mammoth tusks have been found. Polished stone axes from the Neolithic and Copper Age have been found in the municipality. On the Zašat hill, the remains of above-ground houses built of brushwood, timber and mud were discovered, as well as the remains of ceramic vessels, part of a round ceramic weight or coaster, and a stone artefact - a hoe. These are the remains of a high-altitude prehistoric settlement, fortified with an rampart from the Late Bronze Age, i.e. the period between 1200 and 800 BC.

The first mention of Krapinske Toplice dates back to 1334, when the parish list of the Zagreb Diocese mentions the Parish of the Holy Trinity in Toplice. The first precursor to today's hospitals in Krapinske Toplice appears in 1609, when the then owner of the spa, Franjo Keglević, built a xenodochium. It was a building that was used to receive people and was located between the church and the bathing area. Krapinske Toplice experienced rapid development in 1859 when the famous merchant Jakov Badl bought the existing baths and built new ones. In addition to them, a hotel, a health resort, a restaurant were also built, and parks and alleys were formed and planted. In 1882 and 1885, they won gold medals for tourist quality at international exhibitions.

In the mid-20th century, the Spa Resort was founded, which ten years later grew into the Hospital for Rheumatic Diseases and Rehabilitation. The modern take-off in the healthcare sector began in the rheumatology department, and over time, the activities expanded to include orthopedics, neurology, and cardiology. At the end of the 20th century, two new hospital buildings were built. Since 1994, this institution has operated under the name Special Hospital for Medical Rehabilitation Krapinske Toplice. After Croatia gained its independence, Krapinske Toplice became a center of private investment in healthcare. Thus, in 1996, Magdalena, the first private clinic in Croatia, was founded, and in 2008, the Akromion orthopedic hospital was founded.

== Demographics ==
According to the 2021 census, there are 4,827 inhabitants in the area, and the absolute majority are Croats at 98.8%.

The settlements in the municipality are:

- Čret, population 472
- Donje Vino, population 123
- Gregurovec, population 115
- Hršak Breg, population 117
- Jasenovac Zagorski, population 49
- Jurjevec, population 140
- Klokovec, population 740
- Klupci, population 99
- Krapinske Toplice, population 1,257
- Lovreća Sela, population 194
- Mala Erpenja, population 526
- Maturovec, population 76
- Oratje, population 122
- Selno, population 291
- Slivonja Jarek, population 85
- Viča Sela, population 193
- Vrtnjakovec, population 228
Krapinske Toplice: Population trends 1857–2021
v

| population | 4999 | 5845 | 6183 | 6877 | 6757 | 7791 | 7551 | 7913 | 8120 | 7569 | 6930 | 6666 | 6376 | 6111 | 5744 | 5367 | 4827 |
| | 1857 | 1869 | 1880 | 1890 | 1900 | 1910 | 1921 | 1931 | 1948 | 1953 | 1961 | 1971 | 1981 | 1991 | 2001 | 2011 | 2021 |

Sources: Croatian Bureau of Statistics publications

== Administration ==
The current mayor of Krapinske Toplice is Gordana Jureković (SDP) and the Krapinske Toplice Municipal Council consists of 13 seats.

| Groups | Councilors per group |
| SDP | 7 / 13 |
| HDZ | 3 / 13 |
| Independents | 2 / 13 |
| HSU-ZDS | 1 / 13 |

== Bibliography ==
- Matoničkin, Ivo (1957). "Ekološka istraživanja faune termalnih voda Hrvatskog Zagorja" [Ecological Investigations of the Fauna of the Hot Springs of Hrvatsko Zagorje]. Rad Jugoslavenske akademije znanosti i umjetnosti. Odjel za prirodne nauke (in Serbo-Croatian). 733: 139–205. ISSN 1330-5697.
- Vouk, Vale (1916). "Biološka istraživanja termalnih voda Hrvatskoga zagorja" [Biological Explorations of the Hot Springs of Hrvatsko Zagorje]. Prirodoslovna istraživanja Hrvatske i Slavonije (in Serbo-Croatian). 8: 1–17. ISSN 1333-2325.
