= Vedro Polje, Bosanski Petrovac =

Vedro Polje Ведро Поље
- Village
- Location within Bosnia and Herzegovina
- Coordinates: 44°30′23″N 16°23′13″E
- Country: Bosnia and Herzegovina
- Entity: Federation of Bosnia and Herzegovina
- Canton: Una-Sana
- Municipality: Bosanski Petrovac

Area
  - Total: 6.01 sq mi (15.56 km^{2})

Population (2013)
  - Total: 26
  - Density: 4.3/sq mi (1.7/km^{2})
- Time zone: UTC+1 (CET)
  - Summer (DST): UTC+2 (CEST)

Vedro Polje (Serbian Cyrillic: Ведро Поље) is a village in the municipality of Bosanski Petrovac, in Bosnia and Herzegovina.

== Demographics ==
According to the 2013 census, its population was 26.

Ethnicity in 2013
Ethnicity	Number	Percentage
Serbs	25	96.2%
Croats	1	3.8%
Total	26	100%
