= Ahmet Hromadžić =

Bosnian writer

- Born: 11 October 1923; Bjelaj, Bosanski Petrovac, Kingdom of Serbs, Croats and Slovenes
- Died: 1 January 2003 (aged 79); Sarajevo, Bosnia and Herzegovina
- Occupation: Writer

Ahmet Hromadžić (11 October 1923 – 1 January 2003) was a Bosnian writer of children's literature.

== Bibliography ==
- Labudova poljana, novel, Sarajevo, 1952.
- Patuljak iz Zaboravljene zemlje, novel, Sarajevo, 1956.
- Patuljak vam priča, short stories, Sarajevo, 1957.
- Okamenjeni vukovi, novel, Sarajevo, 1963.
- Dječji pisci o sebi,( I, II, III ) prose, Sarajevo 1963.
- Bijeli cvijet, short stories, Sarajevo, 1965.
- Zlatorun, short stories, Sarajevo, 1966.
- Zelengor, short stories, Sarajevo, 1971.
- Bistri potoci, novel, Sarajevo, 1971.
- Bijeli slavuj, short stories, Sarajevo, 1972.
- Dječak jaše konja, novel, Sarajevo 1977.
- Ledena gora, picture book, Sarajevo 1977.
- Patuljak iz zaboravljene zemlje, drama, Sarajevo, 1980.
