= Oraško Brdo =

Oraško Brdo Орашко Брдо
- Village
- Location within Bosnia and Herzegovina
- Coordinates: 44°38′43″N 16°06′17″E
- Country: Bosnia and Herzegovina
- Entity: Federation of Bosnia and Herzegovina
- Canton: Una-Sana
- Municipality: Bosanski Petrovac

Area
  - Total: 3.71 sq mi (9.61 km^{2})

Population (2013)
  - Total: 0
  - Density: 0.0/sq mi (0.0/km^{2})
- Time zone: UTC+1 (CET)
  - Summer (DST): UTC+2 (CEST)

Oraško Brdo (Serbian Cyrillic: Орашко Брдо) is a village in the municipality of Bosanski Petrovac, Bosnia and Herzegovina.

== Demographics ==
According to the 2013 census, its population was 0, down from 65 in 1991.
