= Janjila =

Janjila Јањила
- Village
- Location within Bosnia and Herzegovina
- Coordinates: 44°34′00″N 16°31′20″E
- Country: Bosnia and Herzegovina
- Entity: Federation of Bosnia and Herzegovina
- Canton: Una-Sana
- Municipality: Bosanski Petrovac

Area
  - Total: 12.77 sq mi (33.07 km^{2})

Population (2013)
  - Total: 124
  - Density: 9.71/sq mi (3.75/km^{2})
- Time zone: UTC+1 (CET)
  - Summer (DST): UTC+2 (CEST)

Janjila (Serbian Cyrillic: Јањила) is a village in the municipality of Bosanski Petrovac, Bosnia and Herzegovina.

== Demographics ==
According to the 2013 census, its population was 124, all Serbs.
