= Dobro Selo, Bosanski Petrovac =

Dobro Selo Добро Село
- Village
- Location within Bosnia and Herzegovina
- Coordinates: 44°33′36″N 16°22′47″E
- Country: Bosnia and Herzegovina
- Entity: Federation of Bosnia and Herzegovina
- Canton: Una-Sana
- Municipality: Bosanski Petrovac

Area
  - Total: 5.27 sq mi (13.65 km^{2})

Population (2013)
  - Total: 655
  - Density: 124/sq mi (48.0/km^{2})
- Time zone: UTC+1 (CET)
  - Summer (DST): UTC+2 (CEST)

Dobro Selo (Serbian Cyrillic: Добро Село) is a village in the municipality of Bosanski Petrovac, Bosnia and Herzegovina.

== Demographics ==
According to the 2013 census, its population was 655.

Ethnicity in 2013
Ethnicity	Number	Percentage
Serbs	495	75.6%
Bosniaks	142	21.7%
Croats	4	0.6%
other/undeclared	14	2.1%
Total	655	100%
