= Krnja Jela, Bosanski Petrovac =

Krnja Jela Крња Јела
- Village
- Location within Bosnia and Herzegovina
- Coordinates: 44.616392°N 16.397069°E
- Country: Bosnia and Herzegovina
- Entity: Federation of Bosnia and Herzegovina
- Canton: Una-Sana
- Municipality: Bosanski Petrovac

Area
  - Total: 12.79 sq mi (33.12 km^{2})

Population (2013)
  - Total: 194
  - Density: 15.2/sq mi (5.86/km^{2})
- Time zone: UTC+1 (CET)
  - Summer (DST): UTC+2 (CEST)

Krnja Jela (Serbian Cyrillic: Крња Јела) is a village in the municipality of Bosanski Petrovac, Bosnia and Herzegovina.

== Demographics ==
According to the 2013 census, its population was 194.

Ethnicity in 2013
| Ethnicity | Number | Percentage |
|---|---|---|
| Serbs | 191 | 98.5% |
| Croats | 1 | 0.5% |
| other/undeclared | 2 | 1.0% |
| Total | 194 | 100% |
