= Skakavac, Bosanski Petrovac =

Skakavac Скакавац
- Village
- Location within Bosnia and Herzegovina
- Coordinates: 44°38′22″N 16°19′06″E
- Country: Bosnia and Herzegovina
- Entity: Federation of Bosnia and Herzegovina
- Canton: Una-Sana
- Municipality: Bosanski Petrovac

Population (2013)
  - Total: 22
- Time zone: UTC+1 (CET)
  - Summer (DST): UTC+2 (CEST)

Skakavac (Serbian Cyrillic: Скакавац) is a village in the municipality of Bosanski Petrovac, Bosnia and Herzegovina.

== Demographics ==
According to the 2013 census, its population was 22, all of whom were Serbs.

Ethnicity in 2013
Ethnicity	Number	Percentage
Serbs	22	100%
Total	22	100%
