= Oštrelj, Bosanski Petrovac =

Oštrelj Оштрељ
- Village
- Location within Bosnia and Herzegovina
- Coordinates: 44.477861°N 16.402319°E
- Country: Bosnia and Herzegovina
- Entity: Federation of Bosnia and Herzegovina
- Canton: Una-Sana
- Municipality: Bosanski Petrovac

Area
  - Total: 3.65 sq mi (9.46 km^{2})

Population (2013)
  - Total: 4
  - Density: 1.1/sq mi (0.42/km^{2})
- Time zone: UTC+1 (CET)
  - Summer (DST): UTC+2 (CEST)

Oštrelj (Serbian Cyrillic: Оштрељ) is a village in the municipality of Bosanski Petrovac, Bosnia and Herzegovina.

== Demographics ==
According to the 2013 census, its population was 4, half of them Bosniaks and the other half of other ethnicity.
