= Bukovača =

Bukovača Буковача
- Village
- Location within Bosnia and Herzegovina
- Coordinates: 44.514124°N 16.426512°E
- Country: Bosnia and Herzegovina
- Entity: Federation of Bosnia and Herzegovina
- Canton: Una-Sana
- Municipality: Bosanski Petrovac

Area
  - Total: 6.80 sq mi (17.60 km^{2})

Population (2013)
  - Total: 152
  - Density: 22.4/sq mi (8.64/km^{2})
- Time zone: UTC+1 (CET)
  - Summer (DST): UTC+2 (CEST)

Bukovača (Serbian Cyrillic: Буковача) is a village in the municipality of Bosanski Petrovac, Bosnia and Herzegovina.

== Demographics ==
According to the 2013 census, its population was 152.

Ethnicity in 2013
Ethnicity	Number	Percentage
Serbs	150	0.2%
other/undeclared	2	2.3%
Total	152	100%
