= Lastve =

Lastve Ластве
- Village
- Location within Bosnia and Herzegovina
- Coordinates: 44°41′01″N 16°14′42″E
- Country: Bosnia and Herzegovina
- Entity: Federation of Bosnia and Herzegovina
- Canton: Una-Sana
- Municipality: Bosanski Petrovac

Area
  - Total: 10.85 sq mi (28.11 km^{2})

Population (2013)
  - Total: 61
  - Density: 5.6/sq mi (2.2/km^{2})
- Time zone: UTC+1 (CET)
  - Summer (DST): UTC+2 (CEST)

Lastve (Serbian Cyrillic: Ластве) is a village in the municipality of Bosanski Petrovac, Bosnia and Herzegovina.

== Demographics ==
According to the 2013 census, its population was 61.

Ethnicity in 2013
Ethnicity	Number	Percentage
Serbs	60	98.4%
other/undeclared	1	1.6%
Total	61	100%
