= Risovac, Bosanski Petrovac =

Risovac Рисовац
- Village
- Location within Bosnia and Herzegovina
- Coordinates: 44°45′N 16°12′E
- Country: Bosnia and Herzegovina
- Entity: Federation of Bosnia and Herzegovina
- Canton: Una-Sana
- Municipality: Bosanski Petrovac

Area
  - Total: 10.03 sq mi (25.98 km^{2})

Population (2013)
  - Total: 57
  - Density: 5.7/sq mi (2.2/km^{2})
- Time zone: UTC+1 (CET)
  - Summer (DST): UTC+2 (CEST)

Risovac (Serbian Cyrillic: Рисовац) is a village in the municipality of Bosanski Petrovac, Bosnia and Herzegovina.

== Demographics ==
According to the 2013 census, its population was 57, all Serbs.
