= Rašinovac =

Rašinovac Рашиновац
- Village
- Location within Bosnia and Herzegovina
- Coordinates: 44°34′N 16°21′E
- Country: Bosnia and Herzegovina
- Entity: Federation of Bosnia and Herzegovina
- Canton: Una-Sana
- Municipality: Bosanski Petrovac

Area
  - Total: 5.64 sq mi (14.61 km^{2})

Population (2013)
  - Total: 398
  - Density: 70.6/sq mi (27.2/km^{2})
- Time zone: UTC+1 (CET)
  - Summer (DST): UTC+2 (CEST)

Rašinovac (Serbian Cyrillic: Рашиновац) is a village in the municipality of Bosanski Petrovac, Bosnia and Herzegovina.

== Demographics ==
According to the 2013 census, its population was 398.

Ethnicity in 2013
Ethnicity	Number	Percentage
Bosniaks	327	82.2%
Serbs	62	15.6%
other/undeclared	9	2.3%
Total	398	100%

== Notable residents ==
- Zdravko Čelar
