= Jasenovac, Bosanski Petrovac =

Jasenovac Јасеновац
- Village
- Location within Bosnia and Herzegovina
- Coordinates: 44.556°N 16.575°E
- Country: Bosnia and Herzegovina
- Entity: Federation of Bosnia and Herzegovina
- Canton: Una-Sana
- Municipality: Bosanski Petrovac

Area
  - Total: 7.24 sq mi (18.76 km^{2})

Population (2013)
  - Total: 157
  - Density: 21.7/sq mi (8.37/km^{2})
- Time zone: UTC+1 (CET)
  - Summer (DST): UTC+2 (CEST)

Jasenovac (Serbian Cyrillic: Јасеновац) is a village in the municipality of Bosanski Petrovac, Bosnia and Herzegovina, located east of the town of Bosanski Petrovac, on the M5 road (part of E761) to Ključ, between the villages Bravski Vaganac and Bravsko.

== Demographics ==
In 1991, the village had a total population of 430 people; 424 Serbs, 4 Yugoslavs, and 2 Others/Unknown.

According to the 2013 census, its population was 157.

Ethnicity in 2013
Ethnicity	Number	Percentage
Serbs	153	97.5%
Croats	1	0.6%
other/undeclared	3	1.9%
Total	157	100%
