= Klenovac, Bosanski Petrovac =

Klenovac Кленовац
- Village
- Location within Bosnia and Herzegovina
- Coordinates: 44.5461°N 16.6136°E
- Country: Bosnia and Herzegovina
- Entity: Federation of Bosnia and Herzegovina
- Canton: Una-Sana
- Municipality: Bosanski Petrovac

Area
  - Total: 5.14 sq mi (13.30 km^{2})

Population (2013)
  - Total: 73
  - Density: 14/sq mi (5.5/km^{2})
- Time zone: UTC+1 (CET)
  - Summer (DST): UTC+2 (CEST)

Klenovac (Serbian Cyrillic: Кленовац) is a village in the municipality of Bosanski Petrovac, Bosnia and Herzegovina.

== Demographics ==
According to the 2013 census, its population was 73.

Ethnicity in 2013
Ethnicity	Number	Percentage
Serbs	71	97.3%
other/undeclared	2	2.7%
Total	73	100%
