= Osječenica =

Mountain in Bosnia and Herzegovina

- Осјеченица
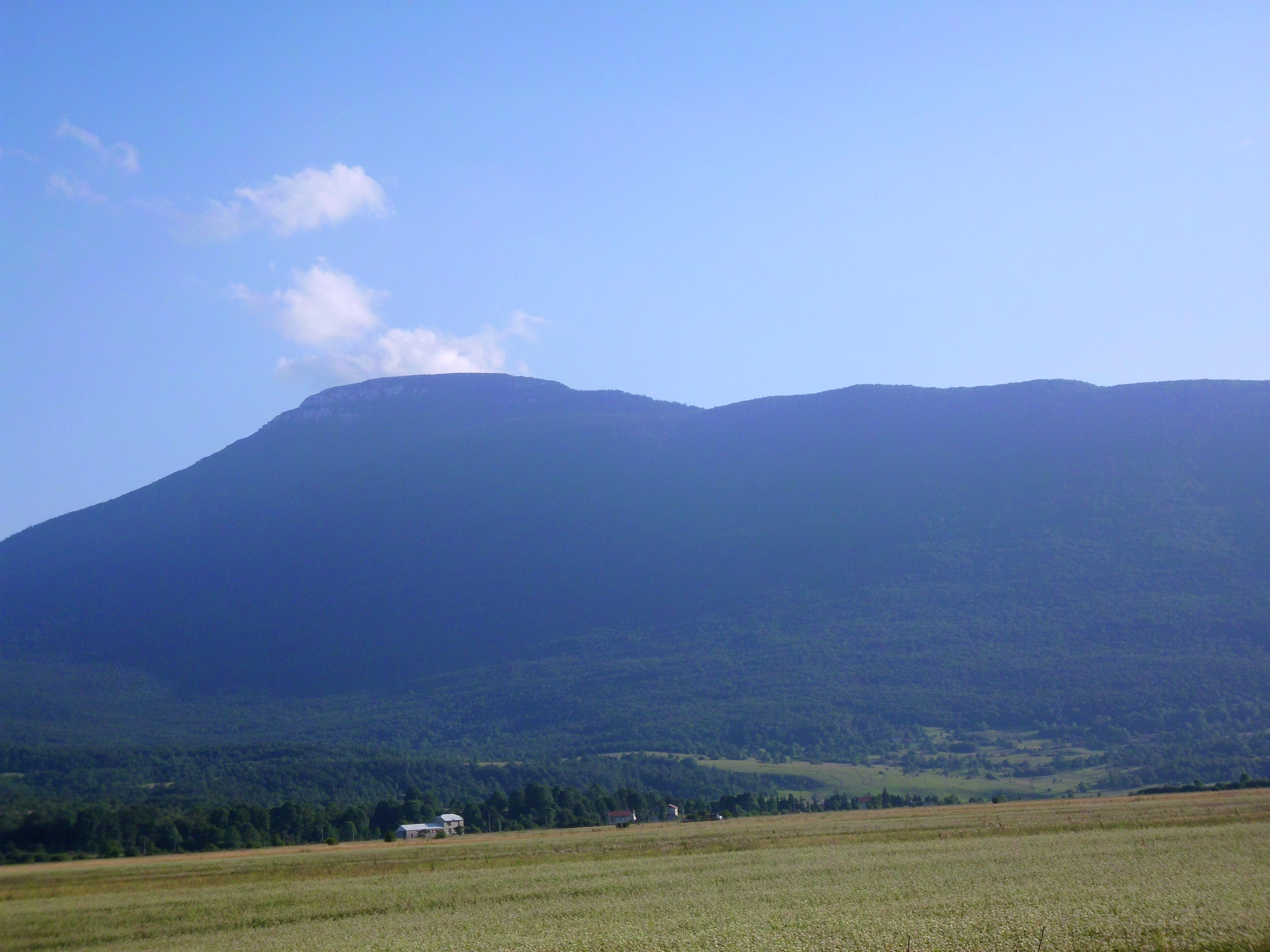
- View from the Medeno Polje

Highest point
- Elevation: 1,795 m (5,889 ft)
- Coordinates: 44°28′49″N 16°17′00″E

Geography
- Location within Bosnia and Herzegovina
- Location: Bosnia and Herzegovina
- Parent range: Dinaric Alps

Osječenica (Serbian Cyrillic: Осјеченица) is a mountain in the municipality of Bosanski Petrovac, Bosnia and Herzegovina. It has an altitude of 1,795 metres (5,889 ft).

== See also ==
- List of mountains in Bosnia and Herzegovina
