= Cimeše =

Cimeše Цимеше
- Village
- Location within Bosnia and Herzegovina
- Coordinates: 44°35′01″N 16°12′59″E
- Country: Bosnia and Herzegovina
- Entity: Federation of Bosnia and Herzegovina
- Canton: Una-Sana
- Municipality: Bosanski Petrovac

Area
  - Total: 6.60 sq mi (17.10 km^{2})

Population (2013)
  - Total: 27
  - Density: 4.1/sq mi (1.6/km^{2})
- Time zone: UTC+1 (CET)
  - Summer (DST): UTC+2 (CEST)

Cimeše (Serbian Cyrillic: Цимеше) is a village in the municipality of Bosanski Petrovac, Bosnia and Herzegovina.

== Demographics ==
According to the 2013 census, its population was 27.

Ethnicity in 2013
Ethnicity	Number	Percentage
Serbs	24	88.9%
Bosniaks	3	11.1%
Total	27	100%
