= Medeno Polje =

Medeno Polje Медено Поље
- Village
- Location within Bosnia and Herzegovina
- Coordinates: 44°34′N 16°16′E
- Country: Bosnia and Herzegovina
- Entity: Federation of Bosnia and Herzegovina
- Canton: Una-Sana
- Municipality: Bosanski Petrovac

Area
  - Total: 10.78 sq mi (27.92 km^{2})

Population (2013)
  - Total: 27
  - Density: 2.5/sq mi (0.97/km^{2})
- Time zone: UTC+1 (CET)
  - Summer (DST): UTC+2 (CEST)

Medeno Polje (Serbian Cyrillic: Медено Поље) is a village in the municipality of Bosanski Petrovac, Bosnia and Herzegovina.

== Demographics ==
According to the 2013 census, its population was 27.

Ethnicity in 2013
Ethnicity	Number	Percentage
Serbs	19	70.4%
Bosniaks	5	18.5%
other/undeclared	3	11.1%
Total	27	100%
