= Jasenovo =

Jasenovo may refer to several places:

- Jasenovo, Slovakia, a village and municipality in Slovakia
- Jasenovo (Nova Varoš), a village in Nova Varoš municipality, Serbia
- Jasenovo, Bela Crkva, a village in Bela Crkva municipality, Serbia
- Jasenovo (Despotovac), a village in Despotovac municipality, Serbia
- Jasenovo, Foča, a village in Foča municipality, Republika Srpska, Bosnia and Herzegovina

== See also ==
- Jasenov (disambiguation)
- Yasenevo (disambiguation)
