= Brestovo (Stanari) =

Brestovo Брестово
- Village
- Location within Bosnia and Herzegovina
- Coordinates: 44°49′07″N 17°46′53″E
- Country: Bosnia and Herzegovina
- Entity: Republika Srpska
- Municipality: Stanari
- Time zone: UTC+1 (CET)
  - Summer (DST): UTC+2 (CEST)

Brestovo (Serbian Cyrillic: Брестово) is a village in the municipality of Stanari, Bosnia and Herzegovina. Until 2014, the settlement was located in the municipality of Doboj.
