= Podsrnetica =

Podsrnetica Подсрнетица
- Village
- Location within Bosnia and Herzegovina
- Coordinates: 44°32′24″N 16°32′19″E
- Country: Bosnia and Herzegovina
- Republic: Republika Srpska
- Municipality: Petrovac
- Time zone: UTC+1 (CET)
  - Summer (DST): UTC+2 (CEST)

Podsrnetica (Serbian Cyrillic: Подсрнетица) is a village in the municipality of Petrovac, Republika Srpska, Bosnia and Herzegovina.
