= Brestovac, Bosanski Petrovac =

Brestovac Брестовац
- Village
- Location within Bosnia and Herzegovina
- Coordinates: 44.654600°N 16.246416°E
- Country: Bosnia and Herzegovina
- Entity: Federation of Bosnia and Herzegovina
- Canton: Una-Sana
- Municipality: Bosanski Petrovac

Area
  - Total: 3.12 sq mi (8.09 km^{2})

Population (2013)
  - Total: 74
  - Density: 24/sq mi (9.1/km^{2})
- Time zone: UTC+1 (CET)
  - Summer (DST): UTC+2 (CEST)

Brestovac (Serbian Cyrillic: Брестовац) is a village in the municipality of Bosanski Petrovac, Bosnia and Herzegovina.

== Demographics ==
According to the 2013 census, its population was 74.

Ethnicity in 2013
Ethnicity	Number	Percentage
Serbs	72	97.3%
other/undeclared	7	2.7%
Total	74	100%
