= Yasenevo =

Yasenevo is a Russian geographical name derived from the word "yasen" (ясень), meaning "ash" (tree). It can refer to several entities, all located in Russia:

- Yasenevo District, a district of the South-Western Administrative Okrug of Moscow
  - Yasenevo metro station in Yasenevo District
  - Yasenevo (estate), a historic mansion in Yasenevo District
- Yasenevo (Moscow Oblast), a village in the Klinsky District of Moscow Oblast
- Yasenevo (Rostov Oblast), a village in the Salsky District of Rostov Oblast
- Yasenevo (Yaroslavl Oblast), a village in the Rybinsk area of Yaroslavl Oblast

== See also ==
- Jasenovo (disambiguation)
