= Jasenovce =

- Municipality
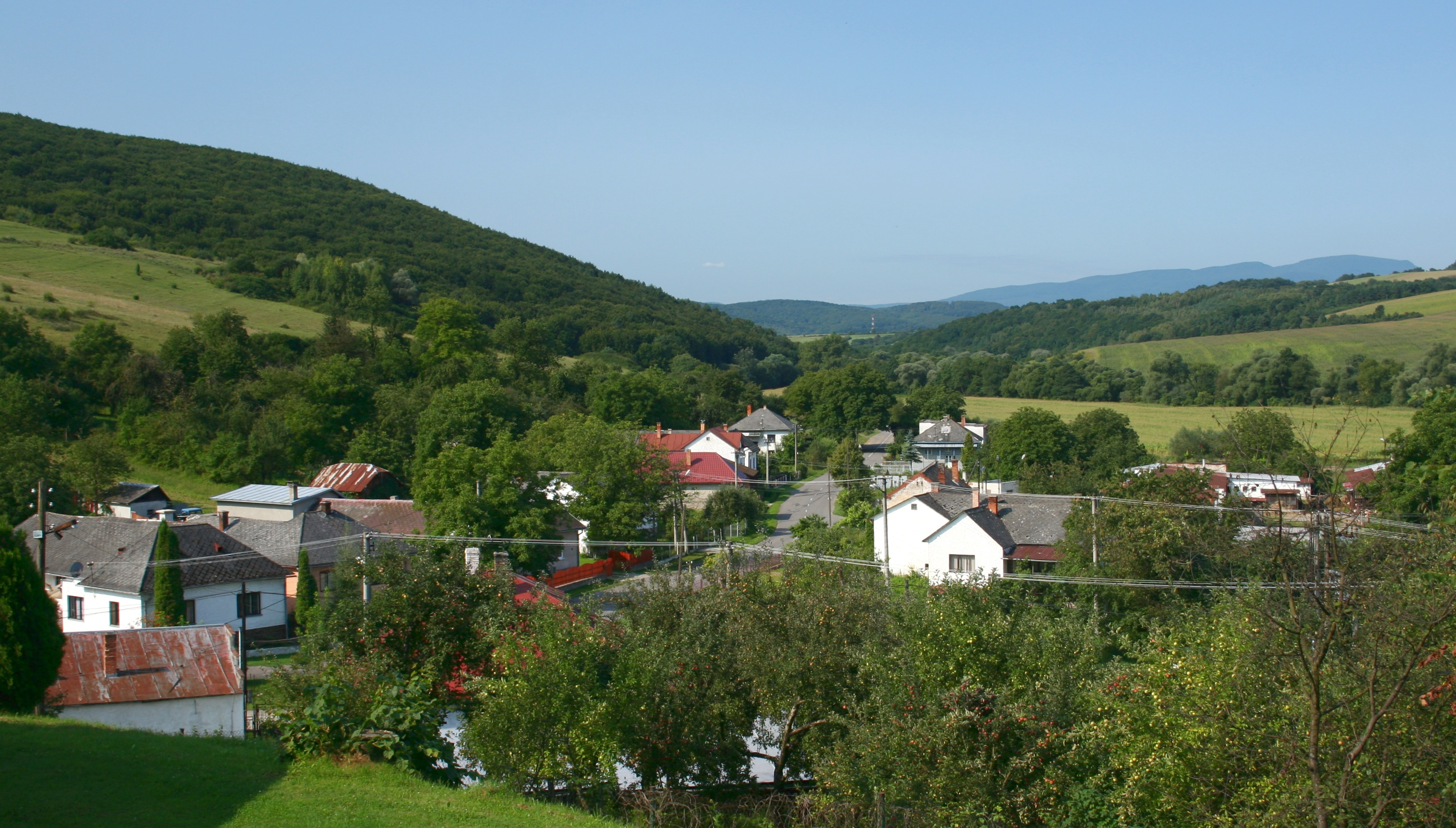

- Flag

- Location of Jasenovce in the Prešov Region Location of Jasenovce in Slovakia
- Coordinates: 49.00°N 21.75°E
- Country: Slovakia
- Region: Prešov Region
- District: Vranov nad Topľou District
- First mentioned: 1543

Area
  - Total: 5.65 km^{2} (2.18 sq mi)
- Elevation: 150 m (490 ft)

Population (2025)
  - Total: 219
- Time zone: UTC+1 (CET)
  - Summer (DST): UTC+2 (CEST)
- Postal code: 940 5
- Area code: +421 57
- Vehicle registration plate (until 2022): VT
- Website: www.jasenovce.sk

Jasenovce (Hungarian: Jeszenőc) is a village and municipality in Vranov nad Topľou District in the Prešov Region of eastern Slovakia.

In historical records the village was first mentioned in 1543.

The municipality lies at an altitude of 166 metres and covers an area of 5.651 km². It has a population of about 232 people.

== Geography ==
The municipality lies at an altitude of 150 metres (490 ft) and covers an area of 5.65 km^{2} (2.18 sq mi) (2025).

== Population ==
Population statistic (10 years)
| Year | 1995 | 2005 | 2015 | 2025 |
|---|---|---|---|---|
| Count | 190 | 229 | 223 | 219 |
| Difference | | +20.52% | −2.62% | −1.79% |

Population statistic
| Year | 2024 | 2025 |
|---|---|---|
| Count | 216 | 219 |
| Difference | | +1.38% |

It has a population of 219 people (31 December 2025).

=== Ethnicity ===
Census 2021 (1+ %)
| Ethnicity | Number | Fraction |
|---|---|---|
| Slovak | 195 | 91.54% |
| Not found out | 10 | 4.69% |
| Czech | 5 | 2.34% |
| Ukrainian | 3 | 1.4% |
| Russian | 3 | 1.4% |
| English | 3 | 1.4% |
| Total | 213 | |

In year 2021 was 213 people by ethnicity 195 as Slovak, 10 as Not found out, 5 as Czech, 3 as Ukrainian, 3 as Russian, 3 as English, 2 as Rusyn, 1 as Polish and 1 as Albanian.

Note on population: The difference values of population numbers in the table "Population statistic" and in the sections "Ethnicity" & "Religion" is caused by the use of various statistical methods.

=== Religion ===
Census 2021 (1+ %)
| Religion | Number | Fraction |
|---|---|---|
| Roman Catholic Church | 183 | 85.92% |
| None | 10 | 4.69% |
| Not found out | 8 | 3.76% |
| Greek Catholic Church | 6 | 2.82% |
| Apostolic Church | 4 | 1.88% |
| Total | 213 | |

In year 2021 was 213 people by religion 183 from Roman Catholic Church, 10 from None, 8 from Not found out, 6 from Greek Catholic Church, 4 from Apostolic Church and 2 from Eastern Orthodox Church.

== Genealogical resources ==
The records for genealogical research are available at the state archive "Statny Archiv in Presov, Slovakia"

- Roman Catholic church records (births/marriages/deaths): 1788-1898 (parish B)
- Greek Catholic church records (births/marriages/deaths): 1855-1925 (parish B)

== See also ==
- List of municipalities and towns in Slovakia
