= Bravski Vaganac =

Bravski Vaganac Бравски Ваганац
- Village
- Location within Bosnia and Herzegovina
- Coordinates: 44°32′53″N 16°28′50″E
- Country: Bosnia and Herzegovina
- Entity: Federation of Bosnia and Herzegovina
- Canton: Una-Sana
- Municipality: Bosanski Petrovac

Area
  - Total: 7.25 sq mi (18.79 km^{2})

Population (2013)
  - Total: 16
  - Density: 2.2/sq mi (0.85/km^{2})
- Time zone: UTC+1 (CET)
  - Summer (DST): UTC+2 (CEST)

Bravski Vaganac (Serbian Cyrillic: Бравски Ваганац) is a village in the municipality of Bosanski Petrovac, Bosnia and Herzegovina.

== Demographics ==
According to the 2013 census, its population was 16, all Serbs.
