= Kolunić =

Kolunić Колунић
- Village
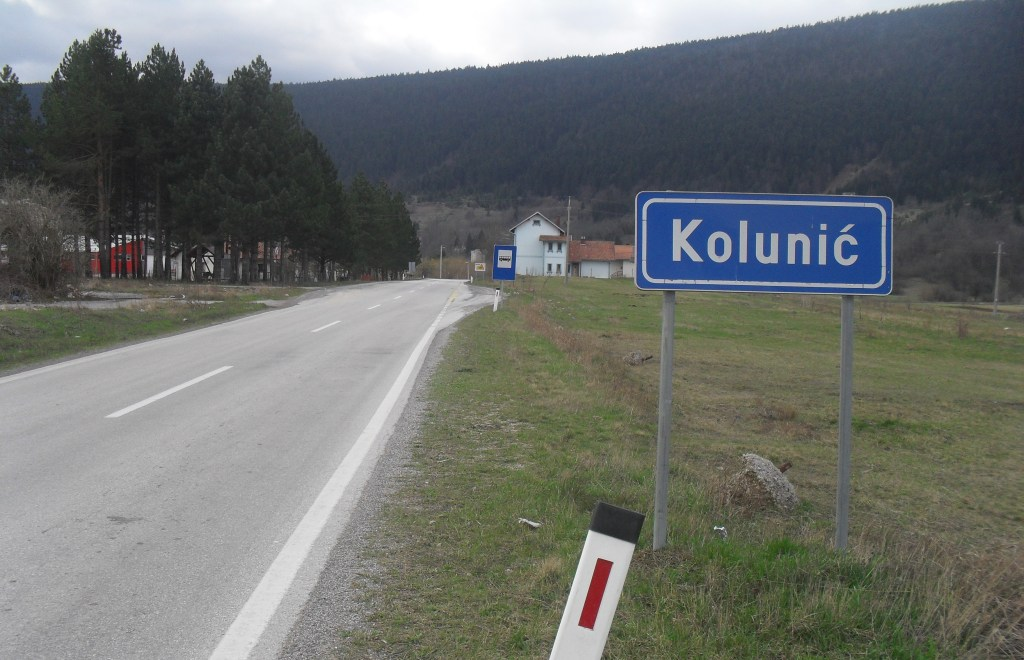
- Traffic sign at the village entrance

- Location within Bosnia and Herzegovina
- Country: Bosnia and Herzegovina
- Entity: Federation of Bosnia and Herzegovina
- Canton: Una-Sana
- Municipality: Bosanski Petrovac

Area
  - Total: 12.53 sq mi (32.46 km^{2})

Population (2013)
  - Total: 232
  - Density: 18.5/sq mi (7.15/km^{2})
- Time zone: UTC+1 (CET)
  - Summer (DST): UTC+2 (CEST)

Kolunić (Serbian Cyrillic: Колунић) is a village that is located in the municipality of Bosanski Petrovac, in Bosnia and Herzegovina.

One of the oldest families originally from the village of Kolunić is the family of Mirković. Petar Mirković (1855-1935), a famous teacher and writer, was born in Kolunić.

== Demographics ==
According to the 2013 census, its population was 232.

Ethnicity in 2013
Ethnicity	Number	Percentage
Serbs	227	97.8%
Croats	2	0.9%
Bosniaks	1	0.4%
other/undeclared	2	0.9%
Total	232	100%
