= Brestovo (Novi Pazar) =

Coordinates: 43.1359°N 20.5918°E

Brestovo Брестово
- Village (Selo)
- Interactive map of Brestovo
- Country: Serbia
- District: Raška
- Municipality: Novi Pazar
- Time zone: UTC+1 (CET)
  - Summer (DST): UTC+2 (CEST)

Brestovo is a village situated in Novi Pazar municipality in Serbia. According to the census of 2002, there were five people (according to the census of 1991, there were nine people). According to the last census of 2011 the village was uninhabited.
