= Brestovac, Leskovac =

Brestovac Брестовац
- Village
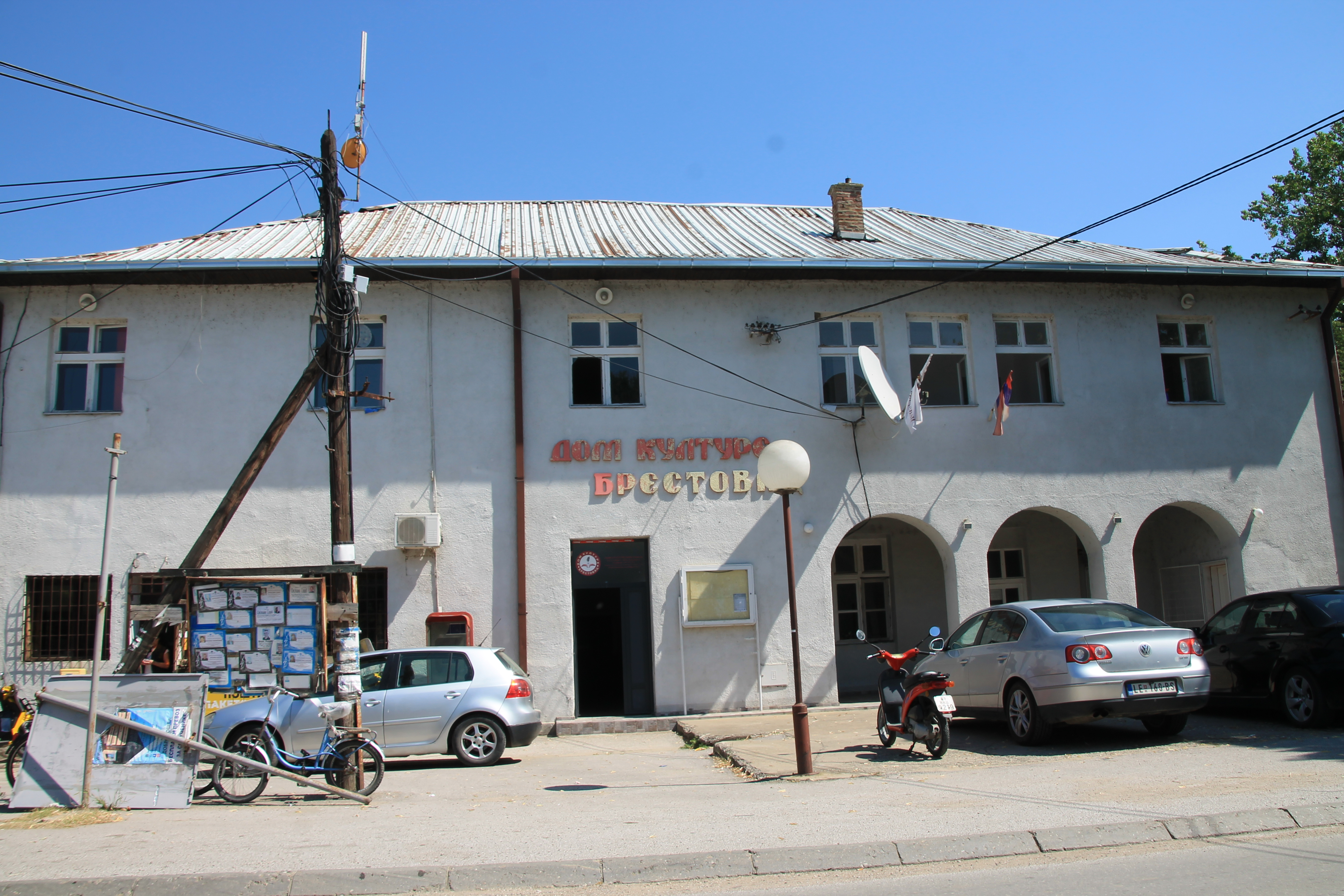

- Location within Serbia
- Coordinates: 43°09′23″N 21°52′46″E
- Country: Serbia
- District: Jablanica District
- Municipality: Leskovac
- Elevation: 653 ft (199 m)

Population (2011)
  - Total: 2,063
- Time zone: UTC+1 (CET)
  - Summer (DST): UTC+2 (CEST)

Brestovac is a village in the municipality of Leskovac, Serbia. According to the 2011 census, the village has a population of 2063.
