= Bjelajski Vaganac =

Bjelajski Vaganac Бјелајски Ваганац
- Village
- Location within Bosnia and Herzegovina
- Coordinates: 44°35′N 16°14′E
- Country: Bosnia and Herzegovina
- Entity: Federation of Bosnia and Herzegovina
- Canton: Una-Sana
- Municipality: Bosanski Petrovac

Area
  - Total: 10.61 sq mi (27.47 km^{2})

Population (2013)
  - Total: 43
  - Density: 4.1/sq mi (1.6/km^{2})
- Time zone: UTC+1 (CET)
  - Summer (DST): UTC+2 (CEST)

Plains in Bjelajski Vaganac

Bjelajski Vaganac (Serbian Cyrillic: Бјелајски Ваганац) is a village in the municipality of Bosanski Petrovac, Bosnia and Herzegovina.

== Demographics ==
According to the 2013 census, its population was 43, all Serbs.
