= Vranovina =

Vranovina Врановина
- Village
- Location within Bosnia and Herzegovina
- Coordinates: 44°40′13″N 16°15′45″E
- Country: Bosnia and Herzegovina
- Entity: Federation of Bosnia and Herzegovina
- Canton: Una-Sana
- Municipality: Bosanski Petrovac

Area
  - Total: 9.50 sq mi (24.61 km^{2})

Population (2013)
  - Total: 57
  - Density: 6.0/sq mi (2.3/km^{2})
- Time zone: UTC+1 (CET)
  - Summer (DST): UTC+2 (CEST)

Vranovina (Serbian Cyrillic: Врановина) is a village in the municipality of Bosanski Petrovac, Bosnia and Herzegovina.

== Demographics ==
According to the 2013 census, its population was 57, all Serbs.
