= Jasen (reserve) =

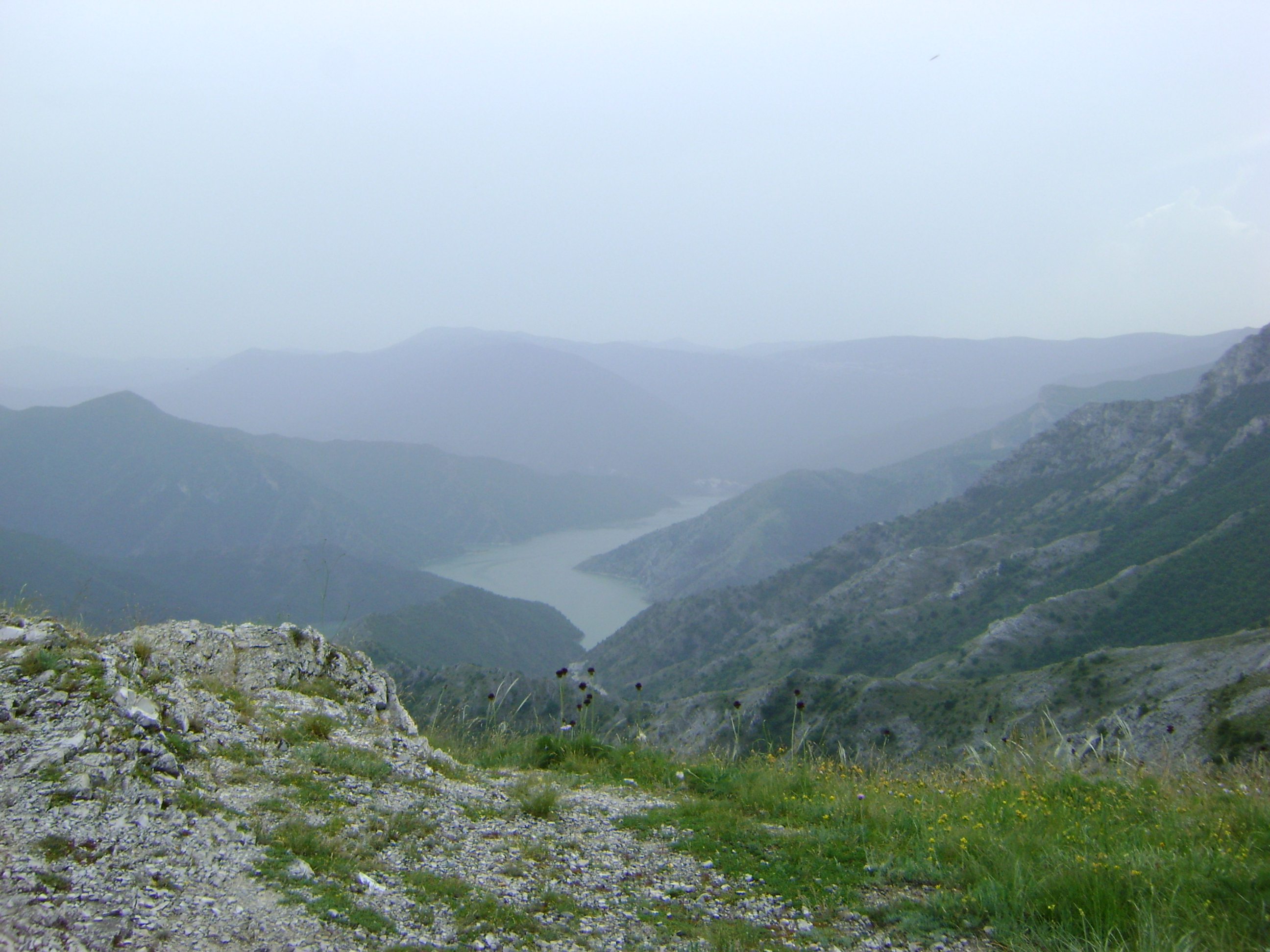
- Natural reserve Jasen

- Location within North Macedonia
- Location: North Macedonia
- Coordinates: 41°51′56″N 21°16′55″E
- Area: 240 km^{2} (93 sq mi)
- Elevation: 2,500 m (8,200 ft)
- Established: 1958 (2010)
- Website: Official website

The Public Enterprise for Managing and Protection of the Multipurpose Area Jasen (Macedonian: Јавно претпријатие за управување и заштита на повеќенаменското подрачје „Јасен“) or just Reservе Jasen (Macedonian: Резерват „Јасен“) is a nature reserve in North Macedonia. It was turned into a protected nature reserve in 2010 (part of it was declared a reserve as far back as 1958) and is situated only 15 km from Skopje. The park comprises around 24,000 hectares (59,000 acres) of caves, mountains, underground rivers and lakes. The lowest point is the still uncharted canyon lake Matka. The highest point is Mount Karadzica with a height of almost 2,500 metres (8,200 ft).

The park is home to the endangered Eurasian lynx and the rare Balkan chamois.

== History ==
The territory of today's Public Enterprise for Managing and Protection of the Multipurpose Area Jasen was already in the period from 1958 to 1960 declared to be a reserve. The declaration had as goal the protection of the fauna, floral, biological, geological, natural and hydrological rarities.
