= Revenik =

Revenik Ревеник
- Village
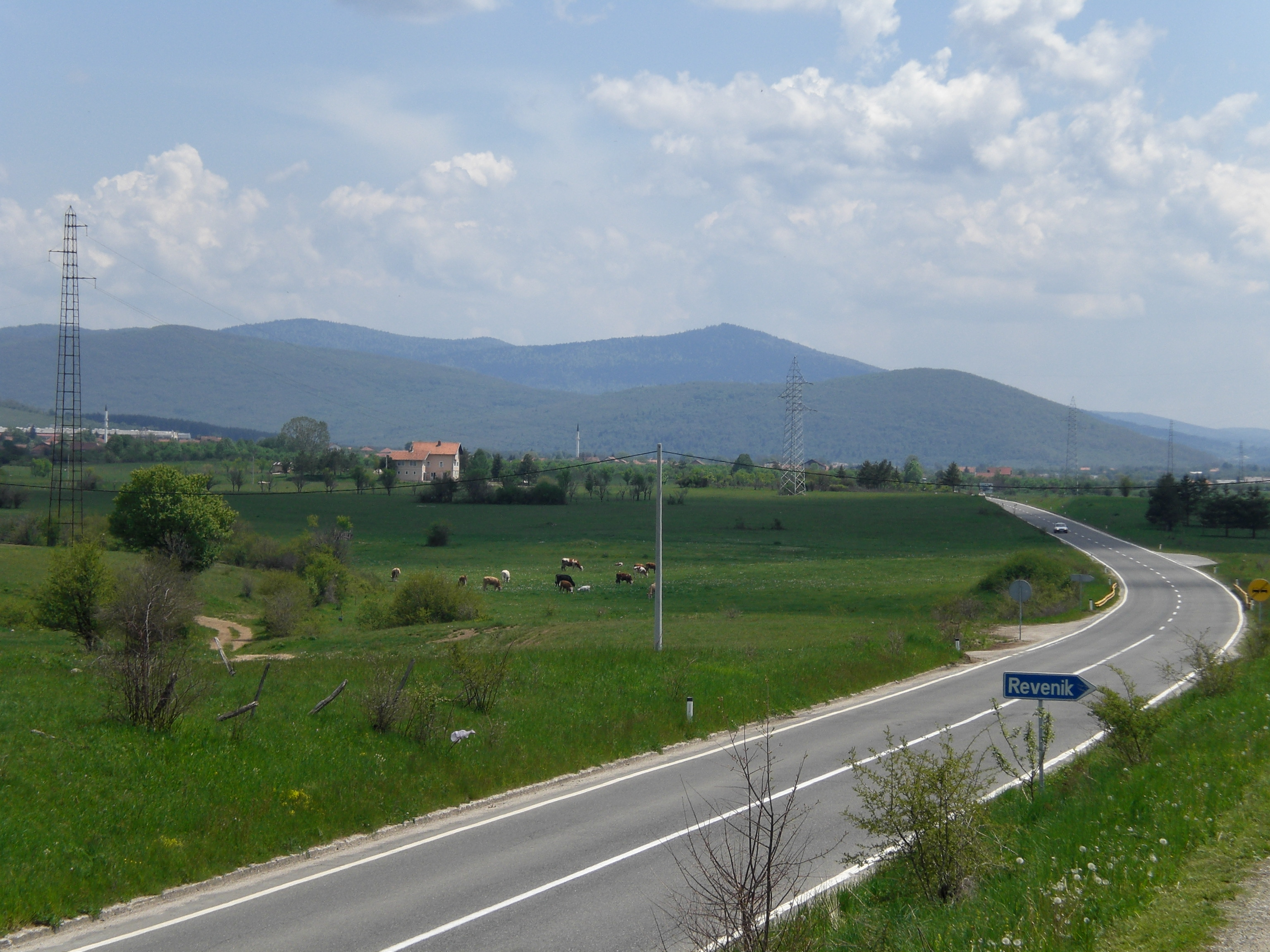

- Location within Bosnia and Herzegovina
- Coordinates: 44°15′N 16°46′E
- Country: Bosnia and Herzegovina
- Entity: Federation of Bosnia and Herzegovina
- Canton: Una-Sana
- Municipality: Bosanski Petrovac

Area
  - Total: 2.98 sq mi (7.73 km^{2})

Population (2013)
  - Total: 59
  - Density: 20/sq mi (7.6/km^{2})
- Time zone: UTC+1 (CET)
  - Summer (DST): UTC+2 (CEST)

Revenik (Serbian Cyrillic: Ревеник) is a village in the municipality of Bosanski Petrovac, Bosnia and Herzegovina.

== Demographics ==
According to the 2013 census, its population was 59.

Ethnicity in 2013
| Ethnicity | Number | Percentage |
|---|---|---|
| Serbs | 45 | 76.3% |
| Bosniaks | 13 | 22.0% |
| other/undeclared | 1 | 1.7% |
| Total | 59 | 100% |
