= Busije, Bosanski Petrovac =

Busije Бусије
- Village
- Location within Bosnia and Herzegovina
- Coordinates: 44°35′43″N 16°11′30″E
- Country: Bosnia and Herzegovina
- Entity: Federation of Bosnia and Herzegovina
- Canton: Una-Sana
- Municipality: Bosanski Petrovac

Area
  - Total: 6.33 sq mi (16.39 km^{2})

Population (2013)
  - Total: 24
  - Density: 3.8/sq mi (1.5/km^{2})
- Time zone: UTC+1 (CET)
  - Summer (DST): UTC+2 (CEST)

Busije (Serbian Cyrillic: Бусије) is a village in the municipality of Bosanski Petrovac, Bosnia and Herzegovina.

== Demographics ==
According to the 2013 census, its population was 24.

Ethnicity in 2013
Ethnicity	Number	Percentage
Bosniaks	15	62.5%
Croats	1	4.2%
Serbs	6	25.0%
other/undeclared	2	8.3%
Total	24	100%
