= Jasen (name) =

Jasen is both a masculine given name and a surname. Notable people with the name include:

Given name:

- Jasen Fisher, American actor
- Jasen Mesić, Croatian politician
- Jasen Rauch, American musician

Surname:

- Hernán Jasen, Argentine basketball player
- Matthew J. Jasen, American lawyer and politician
