= Bara, Bosanski Petrovac =

Bara Бара
- Village
- Location within Bosnia and Herzegovina
- Coordinates: 44.531725°N 16.385117°E
- Country: Bosnia and Herzegovina
- Entity: Federation of Bosnia and Herzegovina
- Canton: Una-Sana
- Municipality: Bosanski Petrovac

Area
  - Total: 2.76 sq mi (7.14 km^{2})

Population (2013)
  - Total: 75
  - Density: 27/sq mi (11/km^{2})
- Time zone: UTC+1 (CET)
  - Summer (DST): UTC+2 (CEST)

Bara (Serbian Cyrillic: Бара) is a village in the municipality of Bosanski Petrovac, Bosnia and Herzegovina.

== Demographics ==
According to the 2013 census, its population was 75.

Ethnicity in 2013
Ethnicity	Number	Percentage
Serbs	73	97.3%
other/undeclared	2	2.7%
Total	75	100%
