= Hedum castellum =

Ancient city in central Bosnia

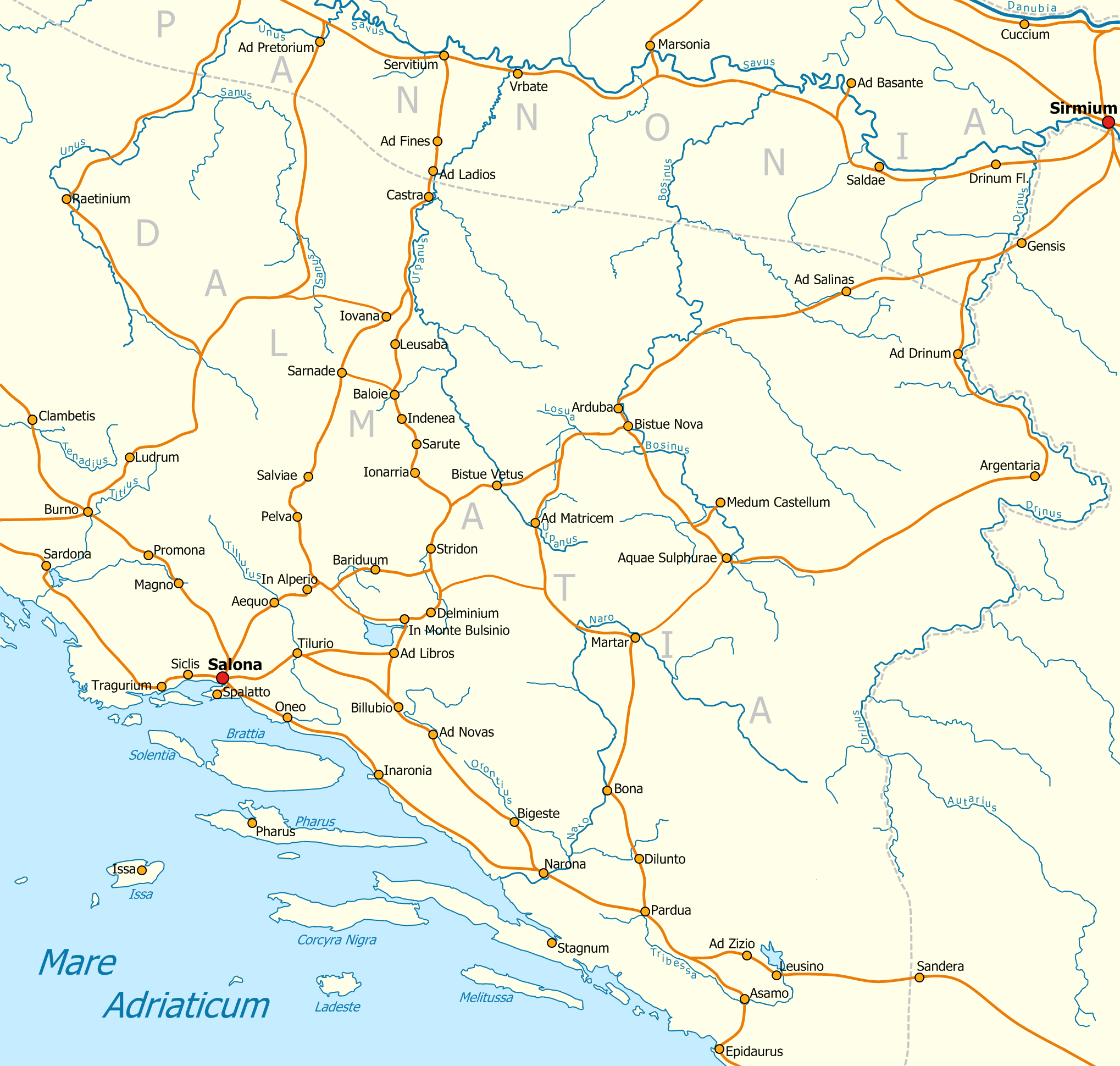
- Hedum castellum is shown on a map of Roman outposts and roads in the provinces of Dalmatia and Pannonia

- Location within Bosnia and Herzegovina
- 44.019854°N 18.264582°E
- Location: Breza, Zenica-Doboj Canton, Bosnia and Herzegovina

Site notes
- Condition: Ruined

Hedum castellum was an ancient city located in central Bosnia, in the modern-day town of Breza, Bosnia and Herzegovina. The name Hedum Kastelum means "Inhabited Castle", or in Serbo-Croatian: Naseljena tvrđava. The city was also the capital of the Illyrian tribe Daesitiates. Today, only the Basilica and some grave tombs remain.
