= Smoljana, Bosanski Petrovac =

Smoljana Смољана
- Village
- Location within Bosnia and Herzegovina
- Coordinates: 44.602455°N 16.436112°E
- Country: Bosnia and Herzegovina
- Entity: Federation of Bosnia and Herzegovina
- Canton: Una-Sana
- Municipality: Bosanski Petrovac

Area
  - Total: 14.09 sq mi (36.50 km^{2})

Population (2013)
  - Total: 151
  - Density: 10.7/sq mi (4.14/km^{2})
- Time zone: UTC+1 (CET)
  - Summer (DST): UTC+2 (CEST)

Smoljana (Serbian Cyrillic: Смољана) is a village in the municipality of Bosanski Petrovac, Bosnia and Herzegovina.

== Demographics ==
According to the 2013 census, its population was 151.

Ethnicity in 2013
Ethnicity	Number	Percentage
Serbs	149	98.7%
other/undeclared	2	1.3%
Total	151	100%
