= Jasenovac Zagorski =

- Village
- Location of Jasenovac Zagorski in Croatia Jasenovac Zagorski (Croatia)
- Coordinates: 46°5′23″N 15°48′29″E
- Country: Croatia
- County: Krapina-Zagorje
- Municipality: Krapinske Toplice

Area
  - Total: 1.0 km^{2} (0.39 sq mi)

Population (2021)
  - Total: 49
  - Density: 49/km^{2} (130/sq mi)
- Time zone: UTC+1 (Central European Time)

Jasenovac Zagorski is a village in the municipality of Krapinske Toplice, Krapina-Zagorje County in Croatia. According to the 2011 census, there are 72 inhabitants in the area.
