= Bosanski Petrovac =

- Town and municipality
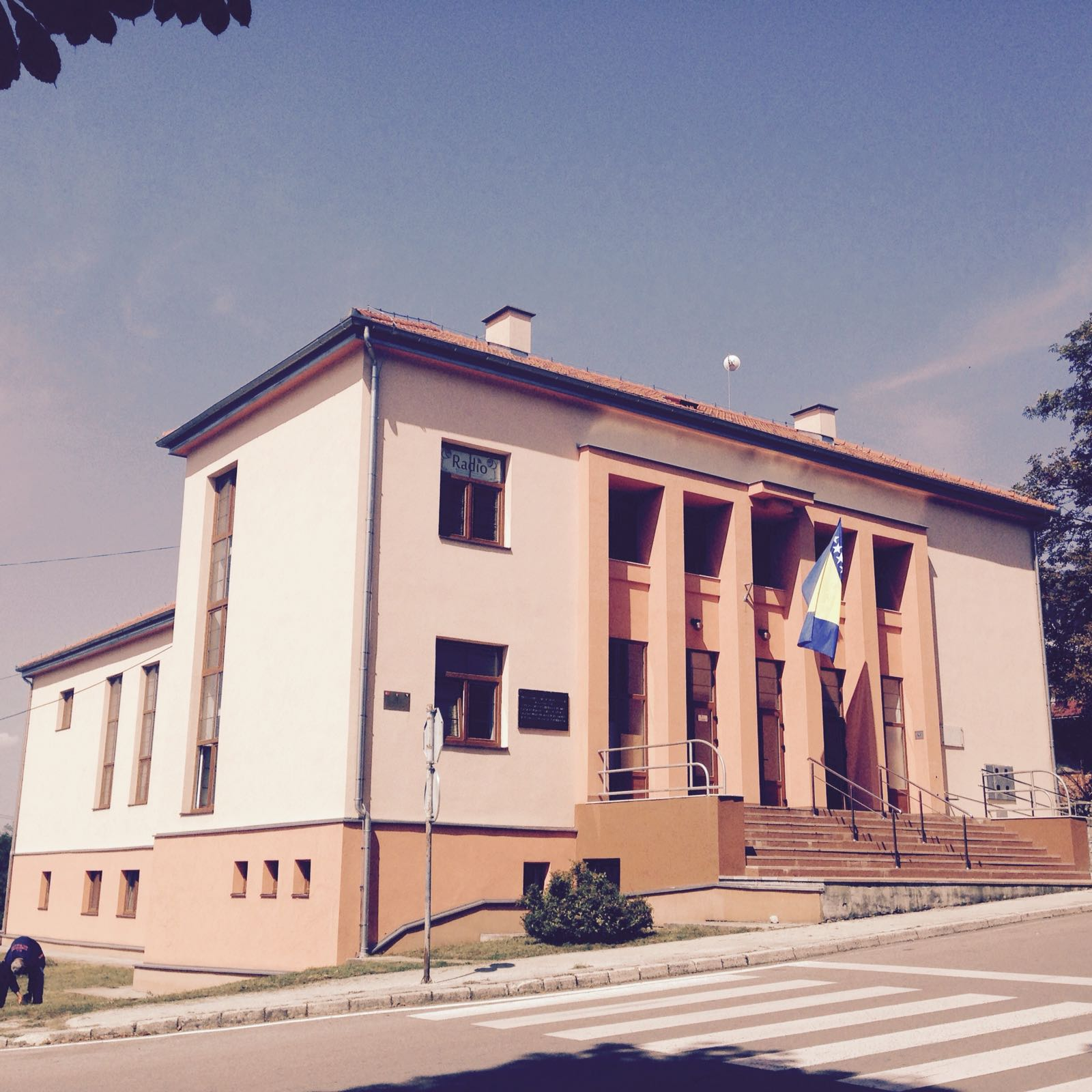
- Bosanski Petrovac

- Coat of arms

- Location of Bosanski Petrovac within Bosnia and Herzegovina.
- Coordinates: 44°33′N 16°22′E
- Country: Bosnia and Herzegovina
- Entity: Federation of Bosnia and Herzegovina
- Canton: Una-Sana
- Geographical region: Bosanska Krajina

Government
  - Mayor: Mahmut Jukić (SDA)

Area
  - Town and municipality: 717 km^{2} (277 sq mi)
- Elevation: 664 m (2,178 ft)

Population (2013 census)
  - Town and municipality: 7,328
  - Density: 11/km^{2} (28/sq mi)
  - Urban: 3,427
- Time zone: UTC+1 (CET)
  - Summer (DST): UTC+2 (CEST)
- Area code: +387 37
- Website: www.bosanskipetrovac.gov.ba

Bosanski Petrovac is a town and municipality located in the Una-Sana Canton of the Federation of Bosnia and Herzegovina, an entity of Bosnia and Herzegovina. As of 2013 census, the municipality has a population of 7,328 inhabitants, while the town has a population of 3,427 inhabitants.

== History ==
The settlement has existed since Roman times. It was conquered by the Ottoman Empire somewhere between 1520 and 1530. From 1929 to 1941, Bosanski Petrovac was part of the Vrbas Banovina of the Kingdom of Yugoslavia.

When the German and Italian Zones of Influence were revised on 24 June 1942, Bosanski Petrovac fell in Zone III, administered civilly by Croatia and militarily by Croatia and Germany.

During the Second World War, it was a Partisan stronghold which was conveniently located close to Marshal Josip Broz Tito's headquarters in Drvar. On 6 December 1942 the Women's Antifascist Front of Yugoslavia (AFŽ) was established in the town. Judita Alargić was a key figure in the first generation of AFŽ organisers.

During the 1992–95 Bosnian War, the town's Serb majority remained in the city while the Bosniaks and Croats were forced to leave their homes. Then in 1995, as the war was nearing its end, the Army of the Republic of Bosnia and Herzegovina seized Bosanski Petrovac and it remained in Bosnian hands until the end of the war. In the following years, the Serbs' right to return would be hindered. However, the town would eventually return to its pre-war ethnic composition.

== Settlements ==
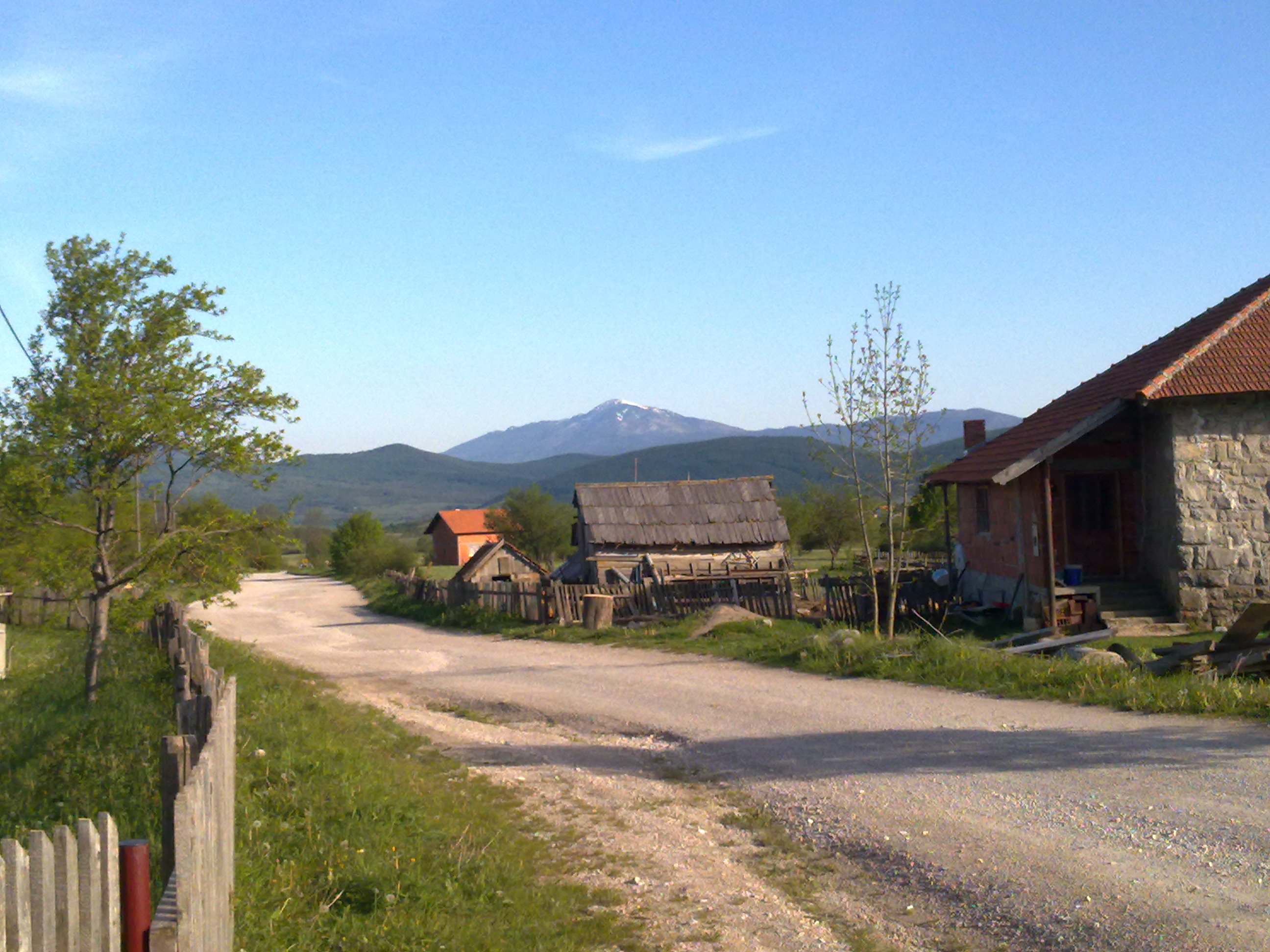
Landscape from one of the villages

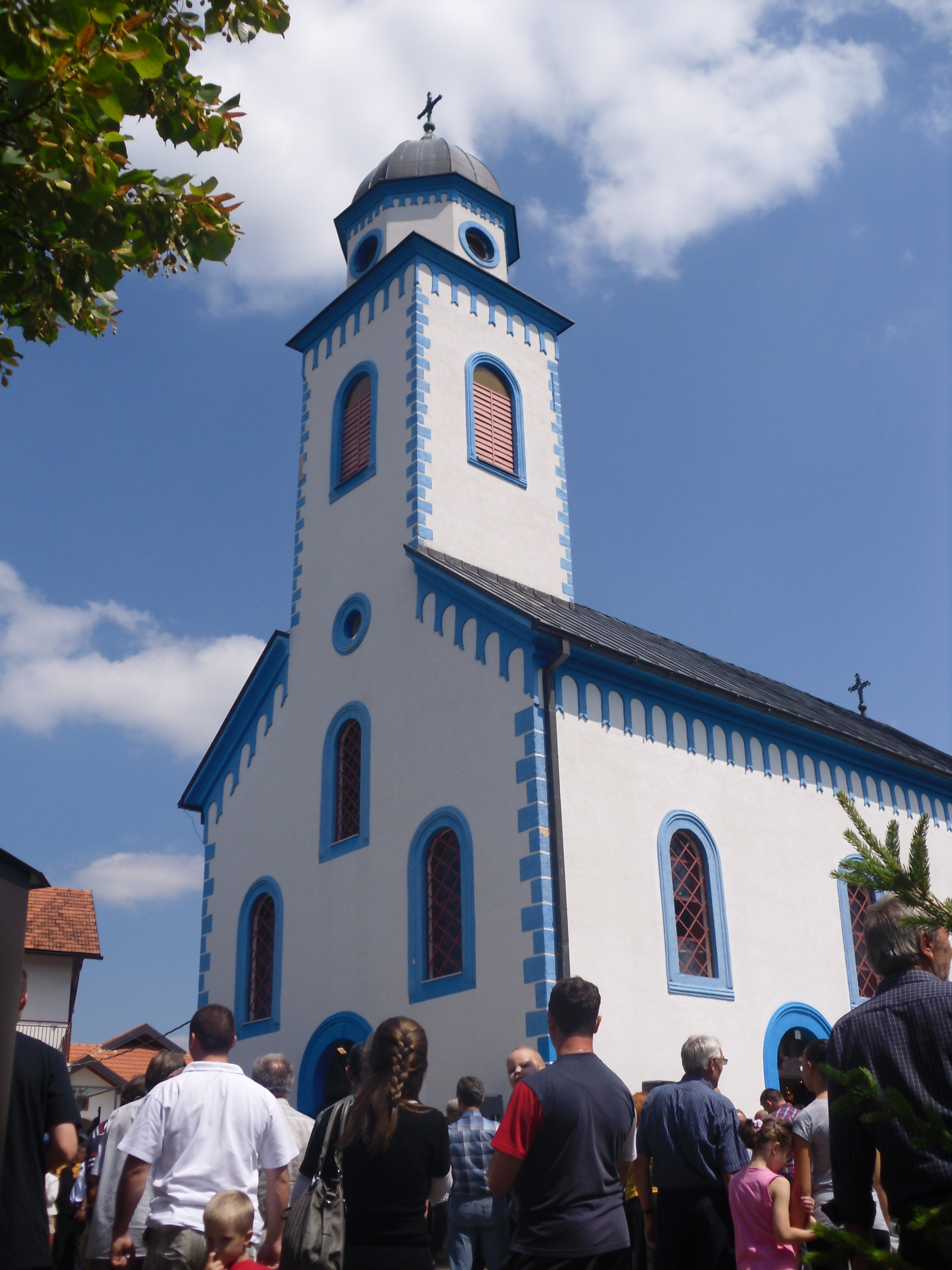
Serbian Orthodox Church

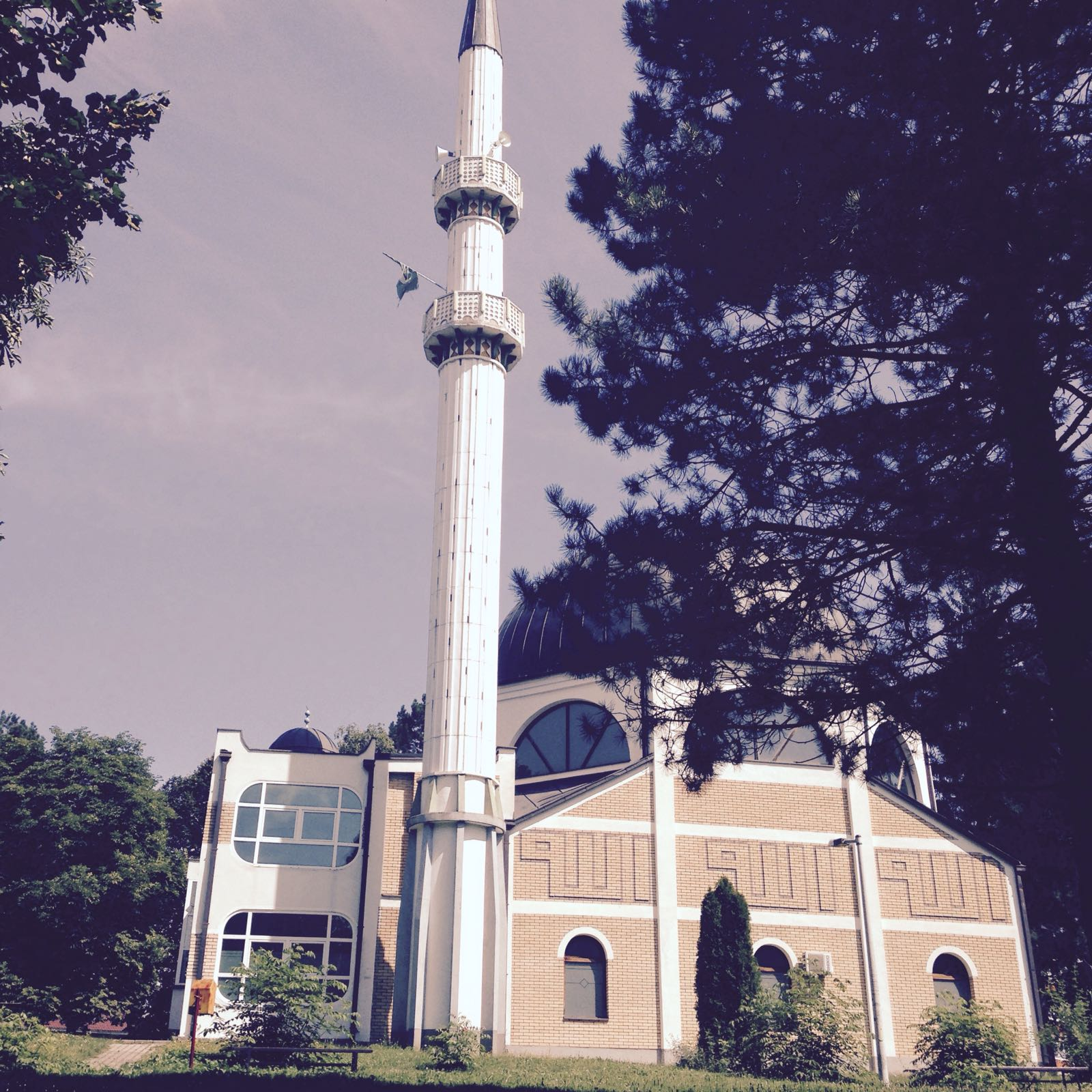
Mosque

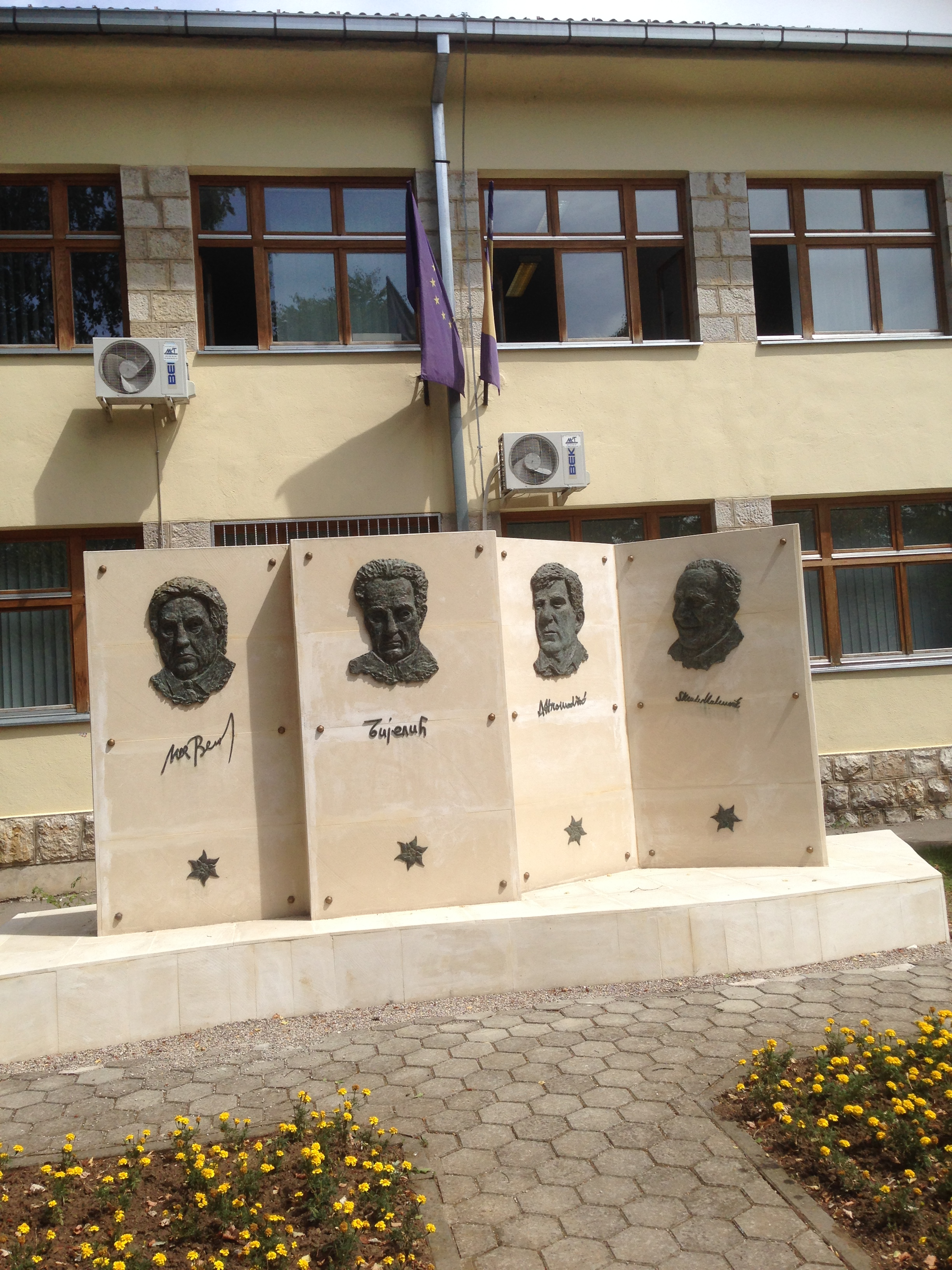
Monument representing notable people from Bosanski Petrovac

- Bara
- Bjelaj
- Bjelajski Vaganac
- Bosanski Petrovac
- Bravski Vaganac
- Brestovac
- Bukovača
- Bunara
- Busije
- Cimeše
- Dobro Selo
- Drinić
- Janjila
- Jasenovac
- Kapljuh
- Klenovac
- Kolunić
- Krnja Jela
- Krnjeuša
- Lastve
- Medeno Polje
- Oraško Brdo
- Oštrelj
- Podsrnetica
- Prkosi
- Rašinovac
- Revenik
- Risovac
- Skakavac
- Smoljana
- Suvaja
- Vedro Polje
- Vođenica
- Vranovina
- Vrtoče

== Demographics ==
=== Population ===
Population of settlements – Bosanski Petrovac municipality
| | Settlement | 1971. | 1981. | 1991. | 2013. |
| | Total | 18,597 | 16,374 | 15,621 | 7,328 |
| 1 | Bosanski Petrovac | 4,016 | 4,547 | 5,381 | 3,427 |
| 2 | Dobro Selo | | | 901 | 655 |
| 3 | Kolonić | | | 521 | 232 |
| 4 | Krnjeuša | | | 958 | 495 |
| 5 | Rašinovac | | | 627 | 398 |

=== Ethnic composition ===
Ethnic composition – Bosanski Petrovac town
| | 2013. | 1991. | 1981. | 1971. |
| Total | 3,427 (100,0%) | 5,381 (100,0%) | 4,547 (100,0%) | 4,016 (100,0%) |
| Bosniaks | 2,608 (75,11%) | 2,678 (49,77%) | 2,248 (49,44%) | 2,551 (63,52%) |
| Serbs | 778 (22,67%) | 2,345 (43,58%) | 1,428 (31,41%) | 1,257 (31,30%) |
| Unaffiliated | 17 (0,496%) | | | |
| Croats | 9 (0,263%) | 28 (0,520%) | 36 (0,792%) | 39 (0,971%) |
| Others | 7 (0,204%) | 77 (1,431%) | 21 (0,462%) | 34 (0,847%) |
| Unknown | 3 (0,088%) | | | |
| Yugoslavs | 1 (0,029%) | 253 (4,702%) | 794 (17,46%) | 124 (3,088%) |
| Montenegrins | 1 (0,029%) | | 11 (0,242%) | 6 (0,149%) |
| Macedonians | 1 (0,029%) | | 7 (0,154%) | 1 (0,025%) |
| Albanians | 1 (0,029%) | | | 2 (0,050%) |
| Turks | 1 (0,029%) | | | |
| Slovenes | | | 2 (0,044%) | 2 (0,050%) |

Ethnic composition – Bosanski Petrovac municipality
| | 2013. | 1991. | 1981. | 1971. |
| Total | 7,328 (100,0%) | 15,621 (100,0%) | 16,374 (100,0%) | 18,597 (100,0%) |
| Serbs | 4,003 (54,53%) | 11,694 (74,86%) | 11,129 (67,97%) | 14,941 (80,34%) |
| Bosniaks | 3,236 (43,38%) | 3,288 (21,05%) | 2,893 (17,67%) | 3,315 (17,83%) |
| Unaffiliated | 30 (0,409%) | | | |
| Croats | 26 (0,355%) | 48 (0,307%) | 49 (0,299%) | 76 (0,409%) |
| Unknown | 12 (0,164%) | | | |
| Others | 11 (0,150%) | 225 (1,440%) | 89 (0,544%) | 92 (0,495%) |
| Roma | 3 (0,041%) | | | |
| Yugoslavs | 2 (0,027%) | 366 (2,343%) | 2 187 (13,36%) | 154 (0,828%) |
| Montenegrins | 1 (0,014%) | | 13 (0,079%) | 13 (0,070%) |
| Macedonians | 1 (0,014%) | | 8 (0,049%) | 1 (0,005%) |
| Slovenes | 1 (0,014%) | | 6 (0,037%) | 3 (0,016%) |
| Albanians | 1 (0,014%) | | | 2 (0,011%) |
| Turks | 1 (0,014%) | | | |

== Notable people ==
- Mersad Berber, painter
- Jovan Bijelić, painter
- Ahmet Hromadžić, writer
- Tomislav Krizmanić, boxer, bronze medal winner at the 1953 European amateur boxing championships
- Skender Kulenović, writer
- Marinko Rokvić, Serbian folk singer

== Bibliography ==
- Trgo, Fabijan, ed. (1964). Zbornik dokumenata i podataka o Narodno-oslobodilačkom ratu Jugoslovenskih naroda. Vol. V, 32.
