= Čret, Croatia =

Settlement in Krapina-Zagorje County, Croatia

Čret
- Settlement
- Interactive map of Čret
- Location of Čret in Croatia
- Coordinates: 46°06′43″N 15°49′08″E
- Country: Croatia
- County: Krapina-Zagorje
- Municipality: Krapinske Toplice

Area
  - Total: 6.8 km^{2} (2.6 sq mi)

Population (2021)
  - Total: 472
  - Density: 69/km^{2} (180/sq mi)
- Time zone: UTC+1 (CET)
  - Summer (DST): UTC+2 (CEST)
- Postal code: 49217 Krapinske Toplice
- Area code: +385 (0)49

Čret is a settlement in the Municipality of Krapinske Toplice in Croatia. In 2021, its population was 472.

== Demographics ==
Čret: Population trends 1857–2021
v

population	565	649	701	828	795	944	896	938	996	942	908	866	777	732	664	571	472
	1857	1869	1880	1890	1900	1910	1921	1931	1948	1953	1961	1971	1981	1991	2001	2011	2021

Sources: Croatian Bureau of Statistics publications
