= Jasenovac, Osijek-Baranja County =

Jasenovac Jeszeföld (Hungarian)
- Village (Selo)
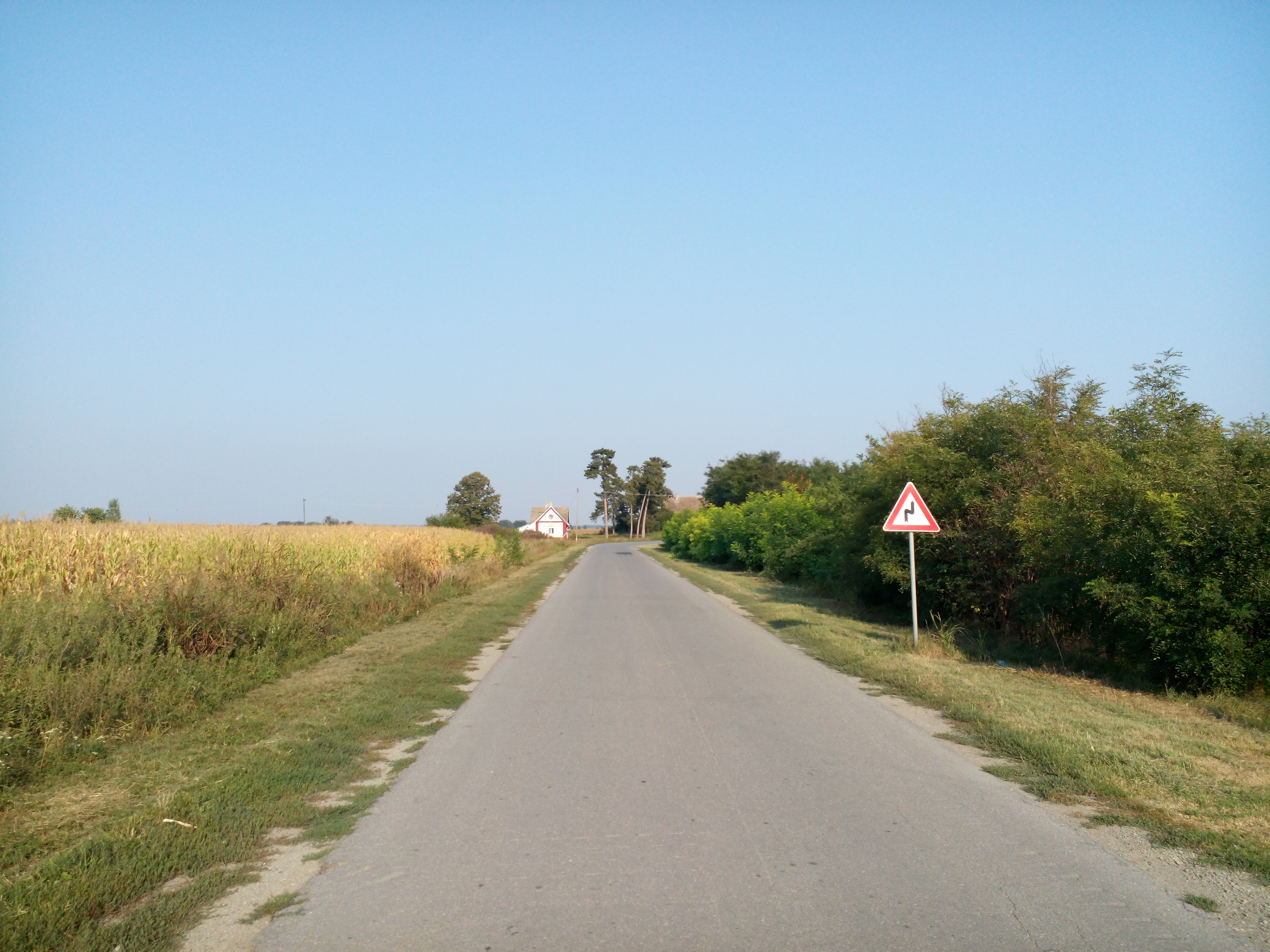

- Location within Osijek-Baranja County Location within Croatia Location within Europe
- Coordinates: 45°43′43″N 18°45′08″E
- Country: Croatia
- Region: Baranya (Podunavlje)
- County: Osijek-Baranja
- Municipality: Kneževi Vinogradi

Area
  - Total: 0.3 km^{2} (0.12 sq mi)

Population (2021)
  - Total: 4
  - Density: 13/km^{2} (35/sq mi)

Jasenovac is a settlement in the region of Baranja, Croatia. Administratively, it is located in the Kneževi Vinogradi municipality within the Osijek-Baranja County. In the 2011 Croatian census it had a population of 35.
