= D205 road =

State road in northwestern Croatia

D205 state road

Route information
- Length: 24.6 km (15.3 mi)

Major junctions
- From: Razvor border crossing to Slovenia
- D507 in Gubaševo
- To: D1 and D307 in Gubaševo

Location
- Country: Croatia
- Counties: Krapina-Zagorje
- Major cities: Klanjec

Highway system
- Highways in Croatia

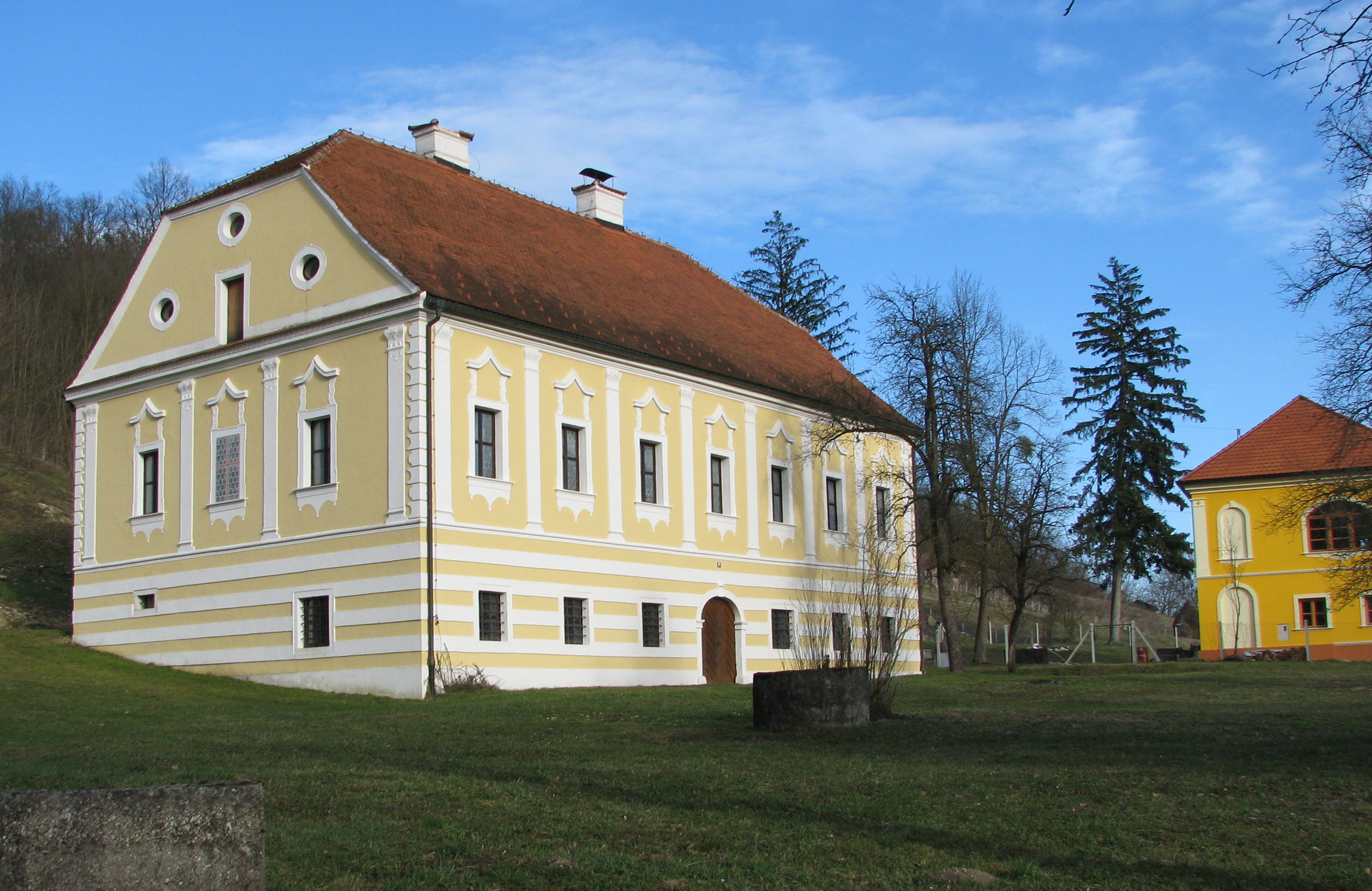
Razvor manor, near the western terminus of the D205 road

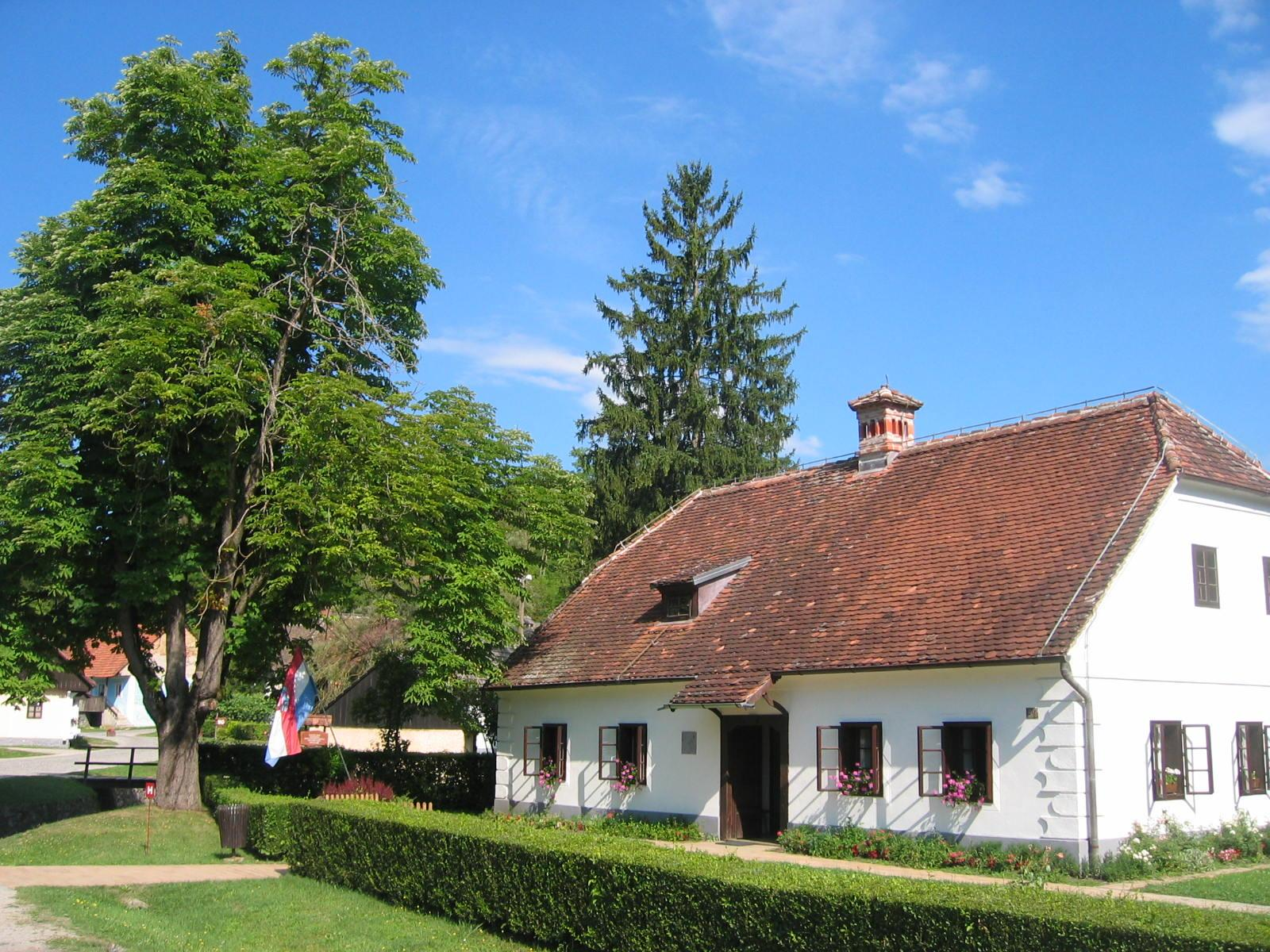
Kumrovec, on the D205 road route

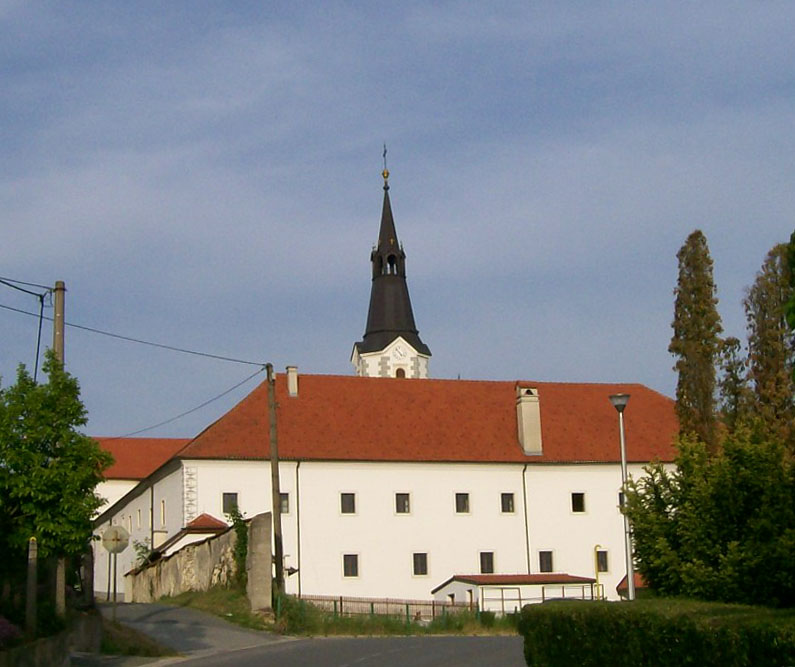
Klanjec, on the D205 road route

D205 is a state road in Hrvatsko Zagorje region of Croatia connecting Razvor border crossing to Slovenia and the towns of Kumrovec and Klanjec to the A2 motorway Zabok interchange via D307 state road. The road is 24.6 km (15.3 mi) long.

This and all other state roads in Croatia are managed and maintained by Hrvatske ceste, state owned company.

== Traffic volume ==
Traffic is regularly counted and reported by Hrvatske ceste, operator of the road.

D205 traffic volume
| Road | Counting site | AADT | ASDT | Notes |
| D205 | 1109 Tuheljske Toplice | 4,633 | 5,885 | Between the Ž2248 and Ž2155 junctions. |

== Road junctions and populated areas ==
D205 junctions/populated areas
| Type | Slip roads/Notes |
| | Razvor border crossing to Slovenia. The route extends to Bistrica ob Sotli, Slovenia. The western terminus of the road. |
| | Ž2152 to Zagorska Sela and Plavić. |
| | Kumrovec; Ž2241 to Goričnica and Ravnice Desinićka. |
| | Risvica |
| | Ž2153 to Pristava and Tuhelj. |
| | Mihanovićev Dol; Ž2186 to Kraljevec na Sutli, Dubravica and Zaprešić (D225). |
| | Klanjec |
| | Dol Klanječki |
| | Sveti Križ; Ž2215 to Lučelnica and Radakovo. |
| | Ž2248 to Tuhelj, Velika Horvatska and Desinić. |
| | Ž2155 to Tuheljske Toplice, Krapinske Toplice and Lepajci (D1). |
| | Dubrovčan |
| | Ž2188 to Ravnice. |
| | D507 to Krapinske Toplice and Valentinovo (D206). |
| | Gubaševo; D1 to Zabok and Sveti Križ Začretje (to the north) and to Zaprešić via D225 (to the south). D307 to the A2 motorway Zabok interchange and to Donja Stubica. Ž2189 to Jalšje. Ž2195 to Pavlovec Zabočki and Veliko Trgovišće. The eastern terminus of the road. |
