= D507 road =

State road in northwestern Croatia

D507 state road

Route information
- Length: 15.6 km (9.7 mi)

Major junctions
- From: D205 near Gubaševo
- To: D206 near Valentinovo

Location
- Country: Croatia
- Counties: Krapina-Zagorje
- Major cities: Krapinske Toplice

Highway system
- Highways in Croatia

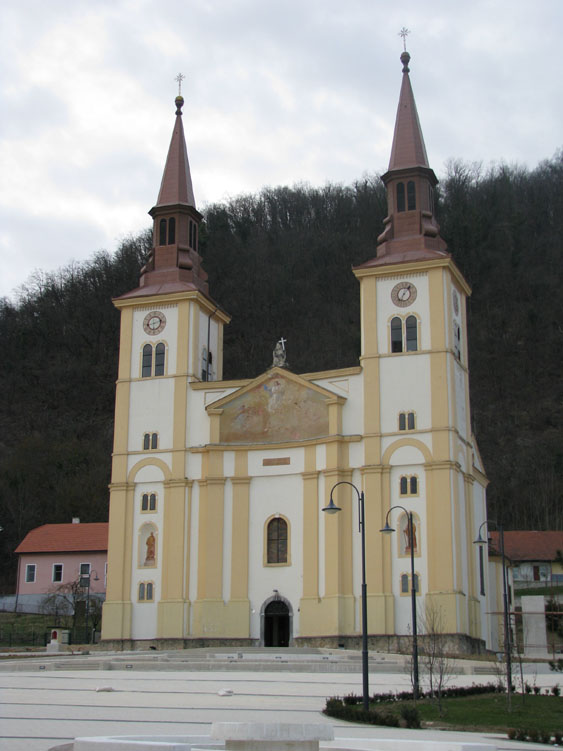
Pregrada, near the northern terminus of the D507 road

D507 is a state road in Hrvatsko Zagorje region of Croatia connecting the D205 state road near Gubaševo to the D206 state road near Pregrada and Krapinske Toplice. The road is 15.6 km (9.7 mi) long.

This and all other state roads in Croatia are managed and maintained by Hrvatske ceste, state owned company.

== Traffic volume ==
Traffic is regularly counted and reported by Hrvatske ceste, operator of the road.

D507 traffic volume
Road	Counting site	AADT	ASDT	Notes
D507	1110 Gubaševo	1,397	1,427	Adjacent to the D205 junction.

== Road junctions and populated areas ==
D507 junctions/populated areas
Type	Slip roads/Notes
	D206 to Krapina (D1) and Pregrada. The northern terminus of the road.
	Krapinske Toplice; Ž2155 to Tuheljske Toplice and Lepajci (D1).
	Ž2153 to Jalšje and Gubaševo.
	D205 to Klanjec, Kumrovec and Razvor border crossing to Slovenia (to the west) and to the A2 motorway Zabok interchange and further on to Donja Stubica via the D307 state road. The southern terminus of the road.
