= Lijepa naša domovino =

National anthem of Croatia

English: 'Our Beautiful Homeland'
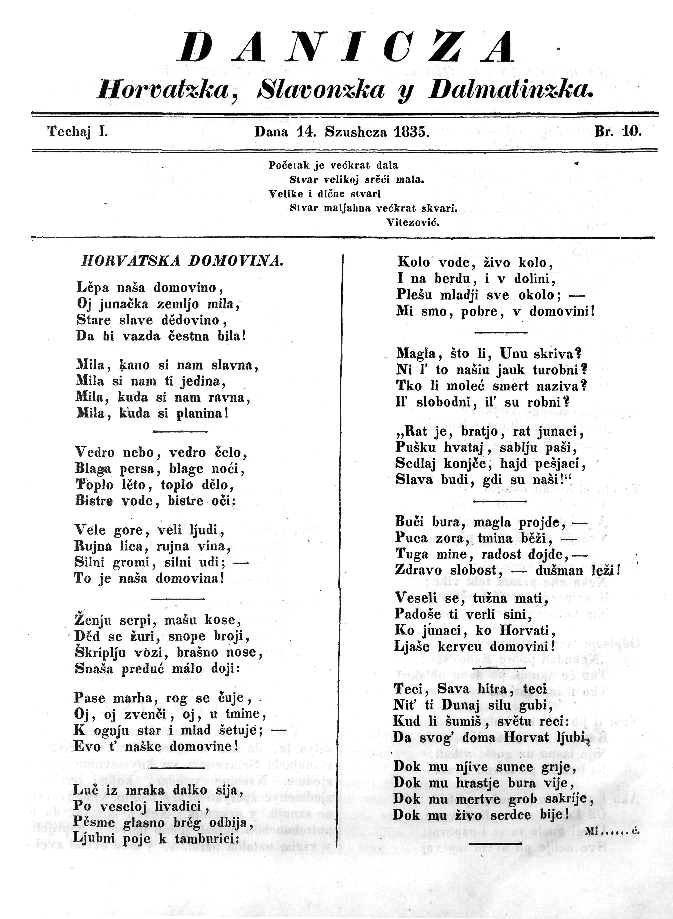
- The anthem's lyrics were first published in the 14 March 1835 issue of Danicza.
- National anthem of Croatia
- Lyrics: Antun Mihanović, 1835
- Music: Josip Runjanin, 1846
- Adopted: 1919 (partially); 1941 (fully)
- Readopted: 29 February 1972

Audio sample
- U.S. Navy Band instrumental version (one verse): file; help

"Lijepa naša domovino" (Croatian: [ljêːpa nâʃa domǒʋiːno]; lit. 'Our Beautiful Homeland') is the national anthem of Croatia. Often simply referred to as "Lijepa naša" ('Our Beautiful') in Croatia, it is a phrase widely used as a metonym for the country.

== History ==
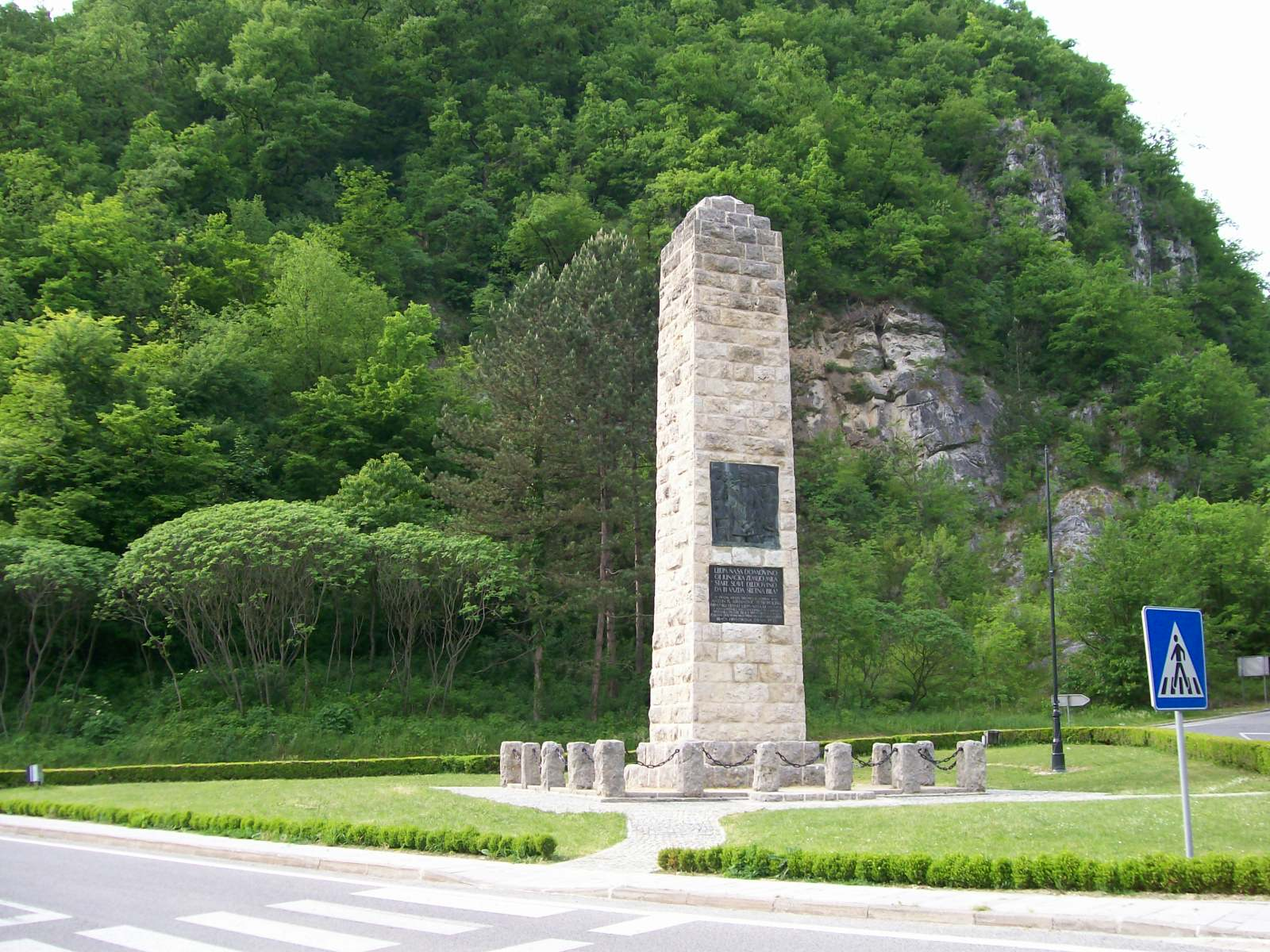

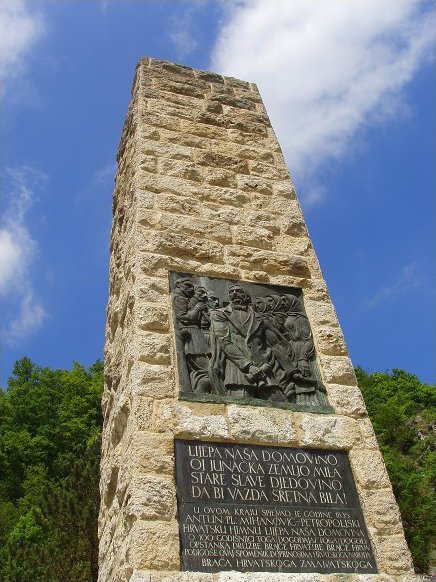
In the Croatian village of Risvica, located between Kumrovec and Klanjec, there is an obelisk commemorating the national anthem, commissioned in 1935 by the Brethren of the Croatian Dragon.

The original lyrics were written by Antun Mihanović and first published under the title "Horvatska domovina" ('Croatian Homeland') in 1835. In 1846, Josip Runjanin (1821–1878) composed the music for "Horvatska domovina". Runjanin's army bandmaster Josip Wendl adapted his music for a military brass orchestra. The original form of the melody is unknown because the original has not been recovered to this day.

The song was scored and harmonized for a male choir by a teacher and organist of the Zagreb Cathedral Vatroslav Lichtenegger in 1861, and after that it started to be performed as the Croats' ethnic anthem. The title "Lijepa naša" has been applied since that time. The original text has 14 verses. Since then, a few minor adjustments have been made to the lyrics.

The song was not immediately adopted by the Croatian Parliament as the national anthem. In 1907, the Association of Croatian Singing Clubs requested the parliament to do so but received no response, even though the song was used as the state anthem in unofficial capacity at ceremonies, including the 29 October 1918 session of parliament when Croatia formally dissolved its ties with Austria-Hungary.

Between 1918 and 1941, segments of the Croatian national anthem were part of the national anthem of the Kingdom of Yugoslavia and it was unofficial hymn of Croats. During the World War II, in the Independent State of Croatia it was also used as state anthem, albeit with some modifications to the lyrics. Croatian Partisans were also using it, for example during ZAVNOH sessions.

The song officially became the state anthem of Croatia through amendments of the Constitution of Croatia adopted by the parliament of the SR Croatia on 29 February 1972. It was confirmed by constitutions of 1974 and 1990, when its lyrics were slightly modified, and by the Coat of Arms, Flag, and National Anthem of the Republic of Croatia Act.

== Lyrics ==
=== Current official ===
On most occasions, only the first verse is performed.

Croatian original

I
Lijepa naša domovino,
Oj, junačka zemljo mila,
Stare slave djedovino,
Da bi vazda sretna bila!

Mila, kano si nam slavna,
Mila, si nam ti jedina,
Mila, kuda si nam ravna,
Mila, kuda si planina!

II
Teci, Dravo, Savo, teci, (Note: Sometimes written Teci Savo, Dravo, teci, especially in older publications.)
Nit' ti, Dunav, silu gubi,
Sinje more, svijetu reci
Da svoj narod Hrvat ljubi

Dok mu njive sunce grije,
Dok mu hrašće bura vije,
Dok mu mrtve grobak krije,
Dok mu živo srce bije!

IPA transcription (Note: See Help:IPA/Croatian and Croatian phonology.)

1
[ljěː.pa nâ.ʃa do.mǒ.ʋi.no]
[oj jǔ.naːt͡ʃ.kaː zêm.ʎoː mǐ.la]
[stâː.re slâ.ʋeː djê.do.ʋi.no]
[dâ bi ʋâz.da srět.na bǐː.la]

[mǐ.la kâː.no si nâm slâːʋ.na]
[mǐ.la si nâm tî jě.diː.naː]
[mǐ.la kǔ.daː si nâm rǎːʋ.na]
[mǐ.la kǔ.daː si pla.nǐ.na]

2
[tě.t͡si drâː.ʋo sâː.ʋo tě.t͡si]
[nit tî dǔ.naʋ sî.lu gǔ.biː]
[sîː.ɲeː môː.re sʋjěː.tu rê.t͡si]
[da sʋôːj nǎː.rod xř̩.ʋaːt ʎûː.biː]

[dôk mu ɲî.ʋe sûːn.t͡se grî.jeː]
[dôk mu xr̩âʃ.t͡ɕe bû.ra ʋî.jeː]
[dôk mu mř̩t.ʋe grô.bak krî.jeː]
[dôk mu ʒǐː.ʋo sr̩̂.t͡se bǐ.je]

English translation

I
Our beautiful homeland,
Oh heroic, dear land,
Fatherland of old glory,
May you be forever blissful.

Dear to us, you that is glorious,
Dear to us, our only one,
Dear to us, where you are flatland,
Dear, where you are mountainous.

II
Flow on, Drava, Sava, flow,
Nor you, Danube, lose your might,
Oh, blue sea, tell the world
How a Croat loves his people.

Whilst the sun warms his fields,
Whilst bura bends his oaks,
Whilst the grave covers his dead,
Whilst his living heart beats.

=== Original poem ===
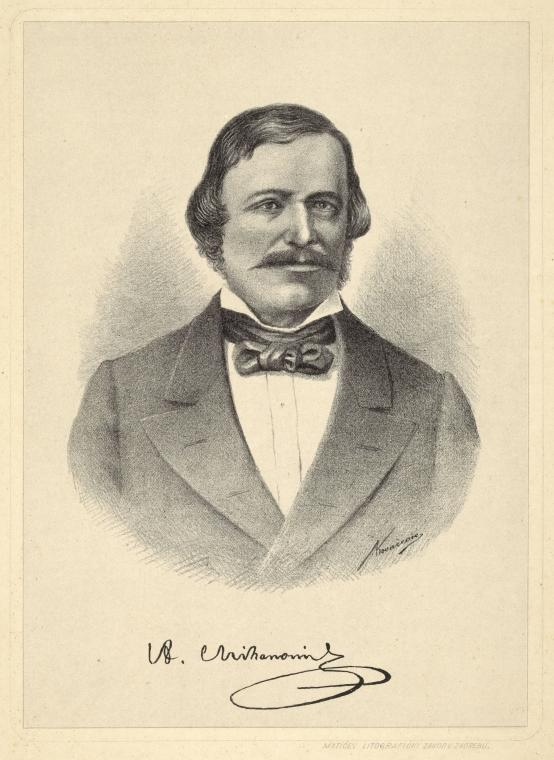
The author of the lyrics, Antun Mihanović

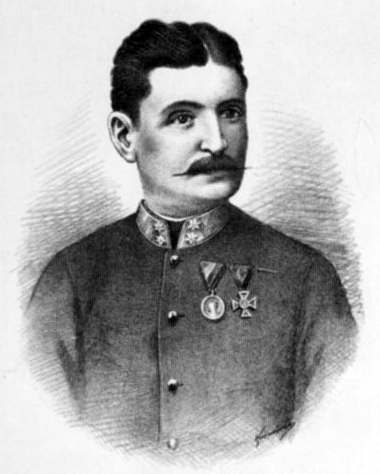
The composer, Josip Runjanin

The poem first published in the cultural magazine Danica ilirska, No. 10, edited by Ljudevit Gaj, in 1835 originally consisted of fourteen verses but today, only verses one, two, thirteen, and fourteen are part of the national anthem.

Croatian original

Lěpa naša domovino,
Oj junačka zemlj́o mila,
Stare slave dědovino,
Da bi vazda čestna bila!

Mila, kano si nam slavna,
Mila si nam ti jedina,
Mila, kuda si nam ravna,
Mila, kuda si planina!

Vedro nebo, vedro čelo,
Blaga persa, blage noći,
Toplo lěto, toplo dělo,
Bistre vode, bistre oči:

Vele gore, veli lj́udi,
Rujna lica, rujna vina,
Silni gromi, silni udi; —
To je naša domovina!

Ženj́u serpi, mašu kose,
Děd se žuri, snope broji,
Škriplj́u vozi, brašno nose,
Snaša preduć málo doji:

Pase marha, rog se čuje,
Oj, oj zvenči, oj, u tmine,
K ognj́u star i mlad šetuje; —
Evo t’ naške domovine!

Luč iz mraka dalko sija,
Po veseloj livadici,
Pěsme glasno brěg odbija,
Lj́ubni poje k tamburici:

Kolo vode, živo kolo,
I na berdu, i v dolini,
Plešu mladj́i sve okolo; —
Mi smo, pobre, v domovini!

Magla, što li, Unu skriva?
Ni l’ to našiu jauk turobni?
Tko li moleć smert naziva?
Il’ slobodni, il’ su robni?

„Rat je, bratjo, rat junaci,
Pušku hvataj, sablj́u paši,
Sedlaj konj́če, hajd pešjaci,
Slava budi, gdi su naši!”

Buči bura, magla projde, —
Puca zora, tmina běži, —
Tuga mine, radost dojde, —
Zdravo slobost, — dušman leži!

Veseli se, tužna mati,
Padoše ti verli sini,
Ko junaci, ko Horvati,
Ljaše kervcu domovini!

Teci, Sava hitra, teci
Nit’ ti Dunaj silu gubi,
Kud li šumiš, světu reci:
Da svog’ doma Horvat lj́ubi,

Dok mu nj́ive sunce grije,
Dok mu hrastje bura vije,
Dok mu mertve grob sakrije,
Dok mu živo serdce bije!

English translation

Our beautiful homeland,
Oh heroic, dear land,
Fatherland of old glory,
May you be forever honored!

Dear to us, you that is glorious,
Dear to us, our only one,
Dear to us, where you are flatland,
Dear, where you are mountainous!

Clear sky, bright forehead,
Gentle bosom, mild nights,
Warm summer, a kind deed,
Clear waters, bright eyes:

Stately hills, noble people,
Flushed faces, red wines,
Mighty thunder, mighty arms;
That is our homeland!

Sickles reaping, scythes are sweeping,
Old man hustles, counts the sheaves,
Carriages creaking, carrying flour,
A lass breastfeeds her little one while spinning thread;

Oxen grazing, a horn's resounding,
Oh, oh it rings, oh, into darkness,
To the hearth walk the old and the young;
Here's our homeland!

Kindling sheds light far from the dark,
All over the cheerful meadow,
Songs echo loudly among the hills,
Lovers singing by the tamburica:

They dance the kolo, lively kolo,
On the hill, and in the valley,
Youth is dancing all around;
We are, my friend, in our homeland!

Is it Una the fog is hiding?
Isn't it our people's woeful wail?
Who is it that prays for death?
Are they free, or the enslaved?

"It's war, brothers, war, heroes,
Grab the rifle, sheathe the saber,
Saddle the horse, onward footmen,
Glory be where there's our people!"

Bura's howling, the fog lifts,
The dawn breaks, the darkness flees,
Sorrow fades, joy arrives,
Hello freedom, the foe has fallen!

Rejoice, oh mourning mother,
Your brave sons fell,
Like heroes, like Croats,
Shed blood for the homeland!

Flow, swift Sava, flow,
Nor you Danube, lose your might,
Wherever you murmur, tell to the world:
That a Croat loves his home,

Whilst the sun warms his fields,
Whilst bura bends his oaks,
Whilst the grave covers his dead,
Whilst his living heart beats!
