= Ravnice =

Ravnice may refer to:

- Ravnice, Zagreb, a neighbourhood of Zagreb, Croatia
- Ravnice, Bosnia and Herzegovina, a village near Bosanski Novi
- Ravnice, Krapina-Zagorje County, a village near Veliko Trgovišće in Croatia
- Ravnice, Primorje-Gorski Kotar County, a village near Čabar, Croatia
- Ravnice Desinićke, a village near Desinić, Croatia

== See also ==
- Ravnica (disambiguation)
