= International Association for the Exchange of Students for Technical Experience =

IAESTE
- Logo of IAESTE
- Formation: 1948
- Type: Non-profit Organization
- Legal status: Association without lucrative purpose
- Purpose: To operate a practical training exchange program that promotes an internationally-oriented development of technical and professional skills amongst students, academic institutions and employers.
- Region served: Worldwide
- Official language: English (as per internal communication)
- Website: iaeste.org

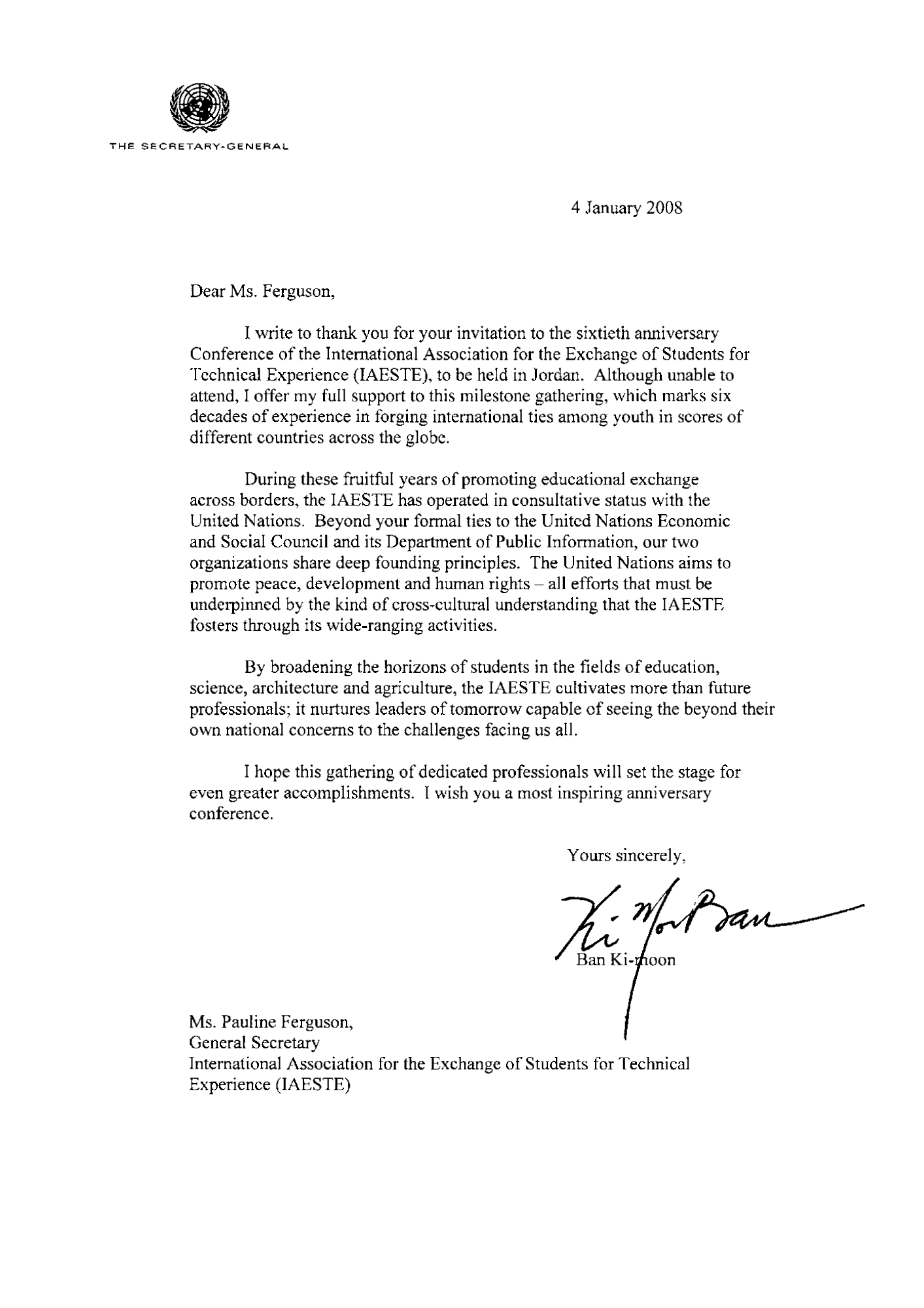
Letter from United Nations Secretary-General Ban Ki-moon.

The International Association for the Exchange of Students for Technical Experience, commonly referred to as IAESTE, is an international organization exchanging students for technical work experience abroad. Students gain relevant technical training lasting from 4 weeks to 52 weeks. IAESTE includes committees representing more than 80 countries, with the potential of accepting new countries into the organization every year. At the general conference 2005 held in Cartagena, Colombia, the statute and by-laws of IAESTE a.s.b.l. were established, making IAESTE a registered "associacion sans but lucratif" (non-profit organization), with the centre in Luxembourg. The current president is Bernard Baeyens from Colombia. IAESTE's motto is "Work, Experience, Discover". IAESTE's aims are to connect students with employers in foreign countries, provide university students with technical experience and culturally enrich students and their host communities.

== History ==
IAESTE was founded in 1948 at Imperial College, London. The Imperial College Vacation Work Committee headed by Mr. James Newby initiated a meeting with national organizations from 10 European countries in a post war effort to promote better understanding between countries and cultures.

Since 1948, the association has grown to include more than 80 countries worldwide and has exchanged in excess of 300,000 students. IAESTE exchanges around 7000 students annually playing an important role in giving technical undergraduates and postgraduates practical work experience and a global perspective.

== Organization structure ==
=== International organization structure ===
The IAESTE Association is a confederation of National Committees representing academic, industrial and student interests. Coordinating the daily administration of the association is the responsibility of the president. The president is elected for two years and is responsible for the General Conference or the GC as it is called in IAESTE. The GC makes the formal decisions in IAESTE and is composed of one delegate (National Secretary) from each country. The GC meets every year in January and is a forum for discussion.

The Board is an elected body which prepares the work of the General Conference and advises the president. It is composed of four elected members and the president.

One other notable event at the GC is the "International Party". At this party, every member country brings a national dish, drinks and clothes.

The international work is funded by member fees based on GDP per capita and the number of students sent abroad and is paid by the National Committees.

=== National organization structure ===
The National Committees represent the member countries and are composed of persons representing academic, industrial and student interests. Every full member of the IAESTE has one vote at the GC. The National Secretary is normally the person with the formal vote, even though the decisions are often made by the whole National Committee.

Each National Committee is responsible for the administration of the exchange in its own country. Membership is given after the establishment of a National Committee in accordance with the statutes of IAESTE, together with a responsible permanent secretariat. The type of secretariat which administers the exchange varies according to each country's national structure, educational system and funding policies. The essential requirement is that the national secretariat, whatever its organization and status, should have competent permanent staff.

Every country has its own way of organizing the work of IAESTE, but the National Committee can mainly be classified into four categories:

- Student-driven - The National Secretary is a student, normally serving for one to two years. Often there is one employed administrative staff for paperwork and keeping contact with other national committees, but the students are making decisions, organizing trainees and even raising funds. Examples are Norway, Denmark, Austria, Slovakia or Croatia.
- Academically - The National Secretary is a professor or employed by a university to front IAESTE on the behalf of the university or the country. Usually, they have students to welcome trainees, but students are not involved in the decision-making. Examples are Turkey, Portugal.
- Governmental - An employee of a governmental international work exchange organization is the National Secretary. Usually, the organization is responsible for several exchange programs and is quite professional. They also often employ students to welcome incoming students. Examples are Finland, Switzerland and UK.
- Other - Non-profit organizations funded by various sources (students, companies, government) but not affiliated with a single institution. Examples are China, USA.

IAESTE varies a lot from country to country and even within countries, there can be a big difference from one city to another. Traineeships also vary a lot: some countries have extended programmes with students employed to help and organize events, while in other places arriving trainees organize events themselves.

== Annual Conference (AC) ==
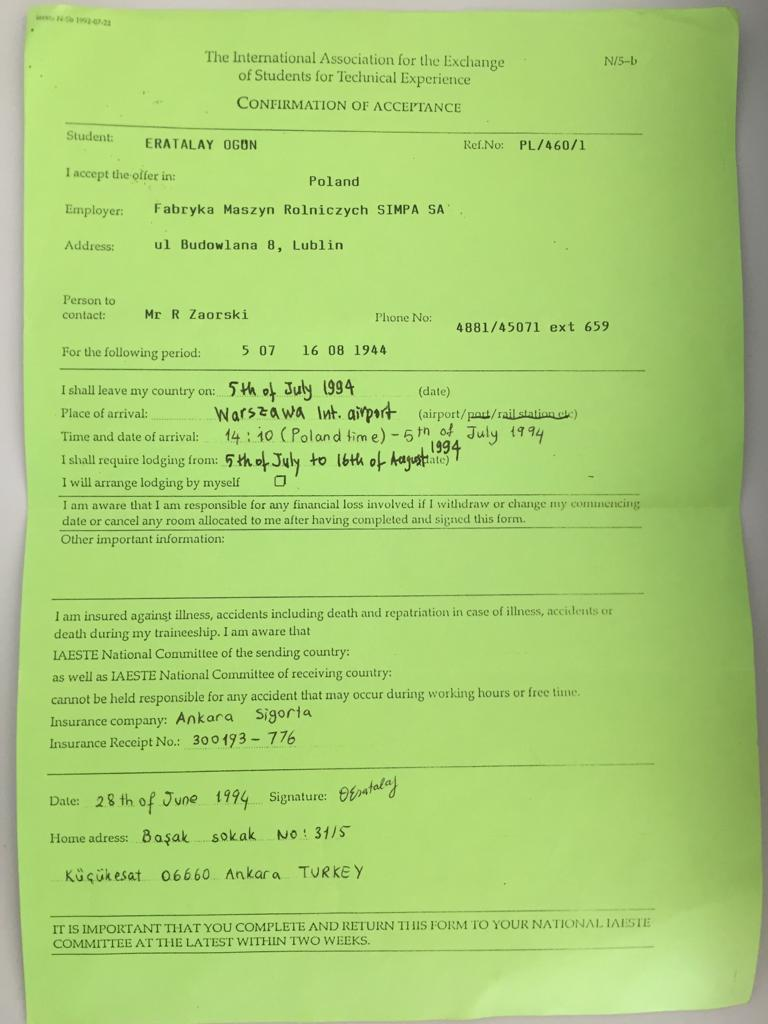
IAESTE acceptance letter for a trainee (page 1)

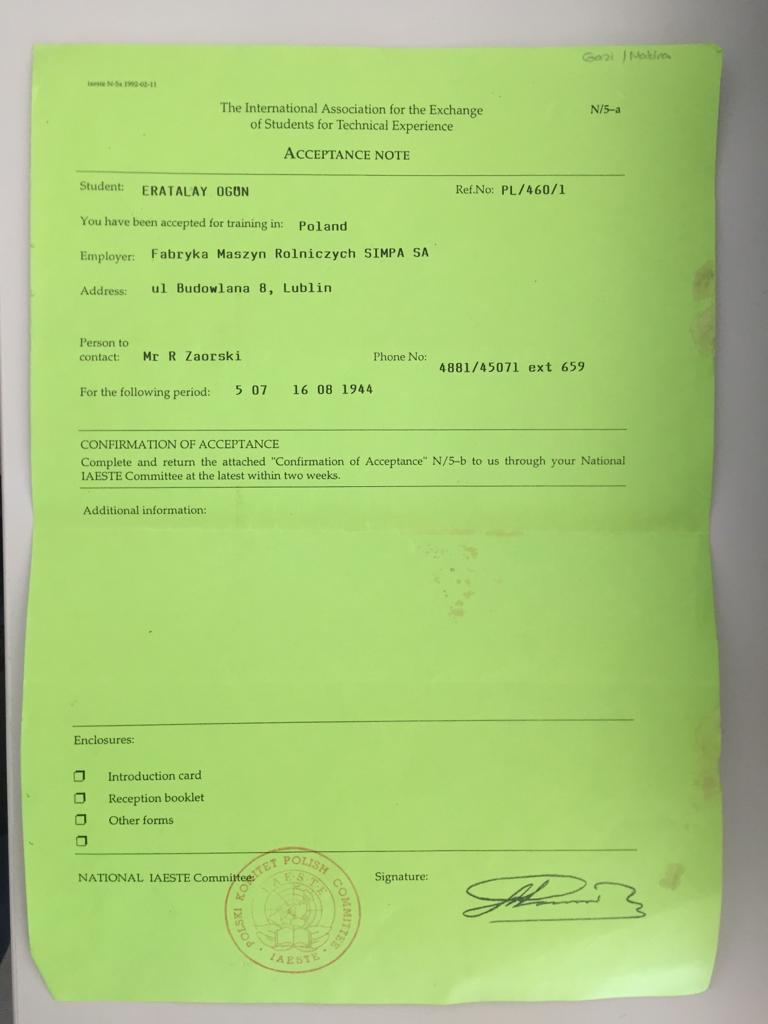
IAESTE acceptance letter for a trainee (page 2)

The most important international event that connects IAESTE leaders from all over the world. The AC 2021 was turned into an online conference, due to the COVID-19 pandemic (coordinated by a small team in Vienna), while AC 2022 and AC 2023 were hybrid conferences.

Year	Country	City
2024	Colombia	Cartagena
2023	Poland	Warsaw
2022	Austria	Vienna
2021	Austria	Vienna (online)
2020	Slovakia	Tatranská Lomnica
2019	Cyprus	Limassol
2018	Germany	Berlin
2017	South Korea	Incheon
2016	Czech Republic	Prague
2015	Croatia	Zagreb
2014	Ecuador	Quito
2013	United Kingdom	Belfast
2012	North Macedonia	Skopje
2011	Thailand	Bangkok
2010	Switzerland	Zürich
2009	Poland	Warsaw
2008	Jordan	Amman, Dead Sea
2007	Portugal	Lisbon
2006	Malta	Marsascala
2005	Colombia	Cartagena
2004	Austria	Vienna
2003	Thailand	Bangkok
2002	Norway	Trondheim
2001	South Africa	Durban
2000	United States	Washington, D.C.
1999	Japan	Tokyo
1998	United Kingdom	Cardiff
1997	Spain	Barcelona
1996	Denmark	Copenhagen
1995	Greece	Athens
1994	Mexico	Mexico City
1993	Ireland	Cork
1992	Germany	Bonn
1991	Cyprus	Nicosia
1990	Brazil	São Paulo
1989	Austria	Graz
1988	Sweden	Stockholm
1987	Hungary	Budapest
1986	Portugal	Lisbon
1985	Turkey	Istanbul
1984	France	Montpellier
1983	Austria	Vienna
1982	Japan	Tokyo
1981	Switzerland	Mürren
1980	Norway	Trondheim
1979	Ireland	Dublin
1978	Netherlands	Amsterdam
1977	United Kingdom	London
1976	Yugoslavia	Dubrovnik
1975	Austria	Salzburg
1974	West Germany	West Berlin
1973	Finland	Helsinki MS Finlandia (ship)
1972	Spain	Barcelona
1971	Denmark	Copenhagen
1970	Portugal	Lisbon
1969	France	Paris
1968	Greece	Athens
1967	Switzerland	Lausanne
1966	Poland	Warsaw
1965	Israel	Haifa
1964	Switzerland	Lucerne
1963	Germany	Munich
1962	United Kingdom	London
1961	Italy	Rome
1960	Yugoslavia	Belgrade
1959	Turkey	Istanbul
1958	Spain	Madrid
1957	West Germany	Bad Aachen
1956	Norway	Trondheim
1955	Austria	Vienna
1954	Sweden	Stockholm
1953	Switzerland	Zürich
1952	Netherlands	Delft
1951	France	Paris
1950	Finland	Helsinki
1949	Denmark	Copenhagen
1948	United Kingdom	London

== The IAESTE Alumni Network (IAN) ==
The Friends of IAESTE Network (FoIN) was founded 1996 in Denmark as the official Alumni branch of IAESTE, with the goal of helping former IAESTE trainees and members keep in touch.

In 2010, FoIN was re-branded as the IAESTE Alumni Network (IAN) and an Alumni Relations Manager was appointed to oversee all activities. The current holder of this position is Bruce Wicks from the United Kingdom. In 2011, IAN launched a new, online network which currently has over 10,000 members.

== IAESTE Day ==
In 2005, an international IAESTE Day was created, for the purpose of global promotion of the organization as well as the celebration of its aims and goals. Starting with 6 countries, IAESTE Day was celebrated in 28 of its member countries in 2007. IAESTE Day is held on 20 October every year.

== JUMP ==
Join Us to Motivate People (JUMP) is the "Motivation and Training Seminar" of IAESTE. JUMP was founded in 1995 in Vienna, Austria on the initiative of Martin Klaus, former National Secretary of IAESTE Austria. Martin became co-ordinator of JUMP, later this role was taken over by Adrian Keller from IAESTE Switzerland and in 2009 by Tomasz (Tomek) Pawliszyn from IAESTE Poland. JUMP is aimed to young members of IAESTE who want to explore more the organisation and meet other members of IAESTE.

Primarily new members of IAESTE meet in a different European city each year during four days in September or October for training sessions and discussion groups. An important component is cultural exchange with corporate tours, cultural events and tours and social events incorporating local cuisine and customs. The theme song for the seminar is Jump (For My Love) by the Pointer Sisters.

Usually, 40 - 70 participants take part in the event. Each JUMP is combined of six workshop sessions, led by experienced members, that cover the essence of IAESTE activities:

- Introduction to IAESTE
- Administration
- Company Marketing and Fundraising
- Job-Raising
- Local Committee Management
- Student Marketing and Member-Raising

Additionally, all participants visit various information boots on the topics of summer reception, career fairs, career websites, etc. All together combined with IAESTE related games, international evening, sightseeing trip and company presentation to show that IAESTE is much more than the exchange of job offers. One of the other highlights is motivation speeches by invited guests.

Because of the global pandemic, the 2020 IAESTE JUMP Conference was virtual, hosted by IAESTE United States August 26–28, 2020.

== CEC ==
The Central European Convention is a group of several IAESTE member countries in the specific geographic region. Those are all "student-run" countries, so students are in the decision making positions (contrary to academic or professional-run countries).

Those countries agree to meet twice a year and hold working and discussion groups. At the same time, they get to know the culture of the hosting country.

=== Goals ===
- Motivation
- Education
- Developing IAESTE
- Improve the situation of student-run countries

=== History ===
The Central European Convention (CEC) was founded in May 1998 in Tuheljske Toplice, Croatia, on the initiative of Thomas Haim, former National Secretary IAESTE AUSTRIA and Mario Kauzlaric, former National Secretary IAESTE CROATIA. Because of the great success, the CEC is held 2 times a year.

Past CECs

- 43. Online (Croatia, October 2021)
- 42. Kope (Slovenia, October 2019)
- 41. Neum (Bosnia and Herzegovina, May 2019)
- 40. Sopron (Hungary, October 2018)
- 39. Wadowice (Poland, May 2018)
- 38. Vienna (Austria, October 2017)
- 37. Žďár nad Sázavou (Czech Republic, April 2017)
- 36. Krk (Croatia, October 2016)
- 35. Stara Lubovna (Slovakia, May 2016)
- 34. Ljubliana (Slovenia, October 2015)
- 33. Prijedor (Bosnia and Herzegovina, May 2015)
- 32. Györ (Hungary, November 2014)
- 31. Ustroń (Poland, May 2014)
- 30. Klagenfurt (Austria, November 2013)
- 29. Vyšší Brod (Czech Republic, April 2013)
- 28. Maribor (Slovenia, October 2012)
- 27. Trencin (Slovakia, April 2012)
- 26. Zánka (Hungary, October 2011)
- 25. Orahovica (Croatia, April 2011)
- 24. Lackenhof (Austria, October 2010)
- 23. Radějov (Czech Republic, April 2010)
- 22. Bohinj (Slovenia, October 2009)
- 21. Novy Smokovec (Slovakia, April 2009)
- 20. Győr (Hungary, October 2008)
- 19. Rijeka (Croatia, May 2008)
- 18. Purbach (Austria, October 2007)
- 17. Kobyli (Czech Republic, April 2007)
- 16. Kranjska Gora (Slovenia, November 2006)
- 15. Trencin (Slovakia Spring 2006)
- 14. Sümeg (Hungary, Fall 2005)
- 13. Wagrain (Austria, May 2005)
- 12. Zagreb (Croatia, November 2004)
- 11. Prague (Czech Republic, April 2004)
- 10. Maribor (Slovenia, April 2003)
- 9. Szentendre (Hungary, September 2002)
- 8. Admont (Austria, May 2002)
- 7. Krapinske Toplice (Croatia, November 2001)
- 6. Prague (Czech Republic, May 2001)
- 5. Myto pod Dumbierom (Slovakia, November 2000)
- 4. Budapest (Hungary, May 2000)
- 3. Kranjska Gora (Slovenia, November 1999)
- 2. Oberalpendorf (Austria, December 1998)
- 1. Tuheljske Toplice (Croatia, 1998)

== See also ==
- Employment website
- AIESEC
