= Veliko Trgovišće =

- Municipality
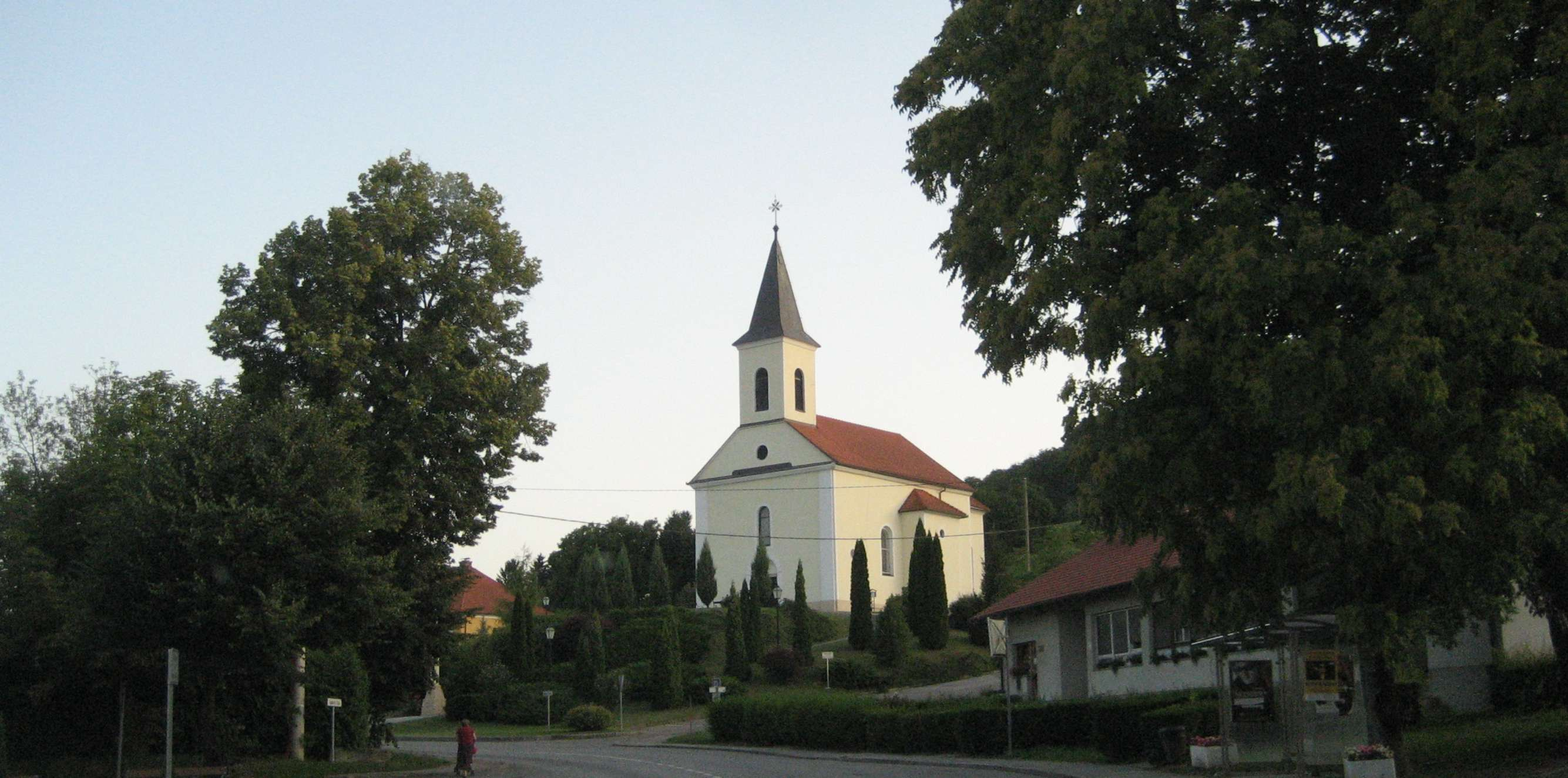
- Parish church in Veliko Trgovišće

- Location of Veliko Trgovišće in Croatia
- Coordinates: 46°00′N 15°51′E
- Country: Croatia
- County: Krapina-Zagorje County

Government
  - Mayor: Robert Greblički (Independent)

Area
  - Municipality: 46.7 km^{2} (18.0 sq mi)
  - Urban: 6.4 km^{2} (2.5 sq mi)

Population (2021)
  - Municipality: 4,448
  - Density: 95.2/km^{2} (247/sq mi)
  - Urban: 1,193
  - Urban density: 190/km^{2} (480/sq mi)
- Postal code: 49214
- Website: veliko-trgovisce.hr

Veliko Trgovišće is a village and municipality in Krapina-Zagorje County in Croatia located just south-west from nearby town Zabok. It is best known as the birthplace of the first president of Croatia Franjo Tuđman.

== History ==
Veliko Trgovišće was first mentioned in written documents in 1501. The origin of the town of Veliko Trgovišće is linked to the construction of a road, and later a railway. Before that, the town of Jezero was mentioned as the center, where the church of Saint George was built, on which the year 1622 is carved above the portal. Children were also educated in the settlement as early as 1700. The church of the Three Kings in Velika Erpenja was built in 1650, and the chapel of the Virgin Mary in Strmec succeeded the wooden chapel on the same site in 1772. In that chapel there is a statue of Our Lady of the Snows from around 525. The parish palace in Veliki Trgovišće was built in 1842, and the parish church in Veliki Trgovišće was built in 1876. In 1889, construction of the school began, which was completed in 1891, and a little later, the municipal building was built. In 1932, the fire department was founded and in 1936 a football club was founded.

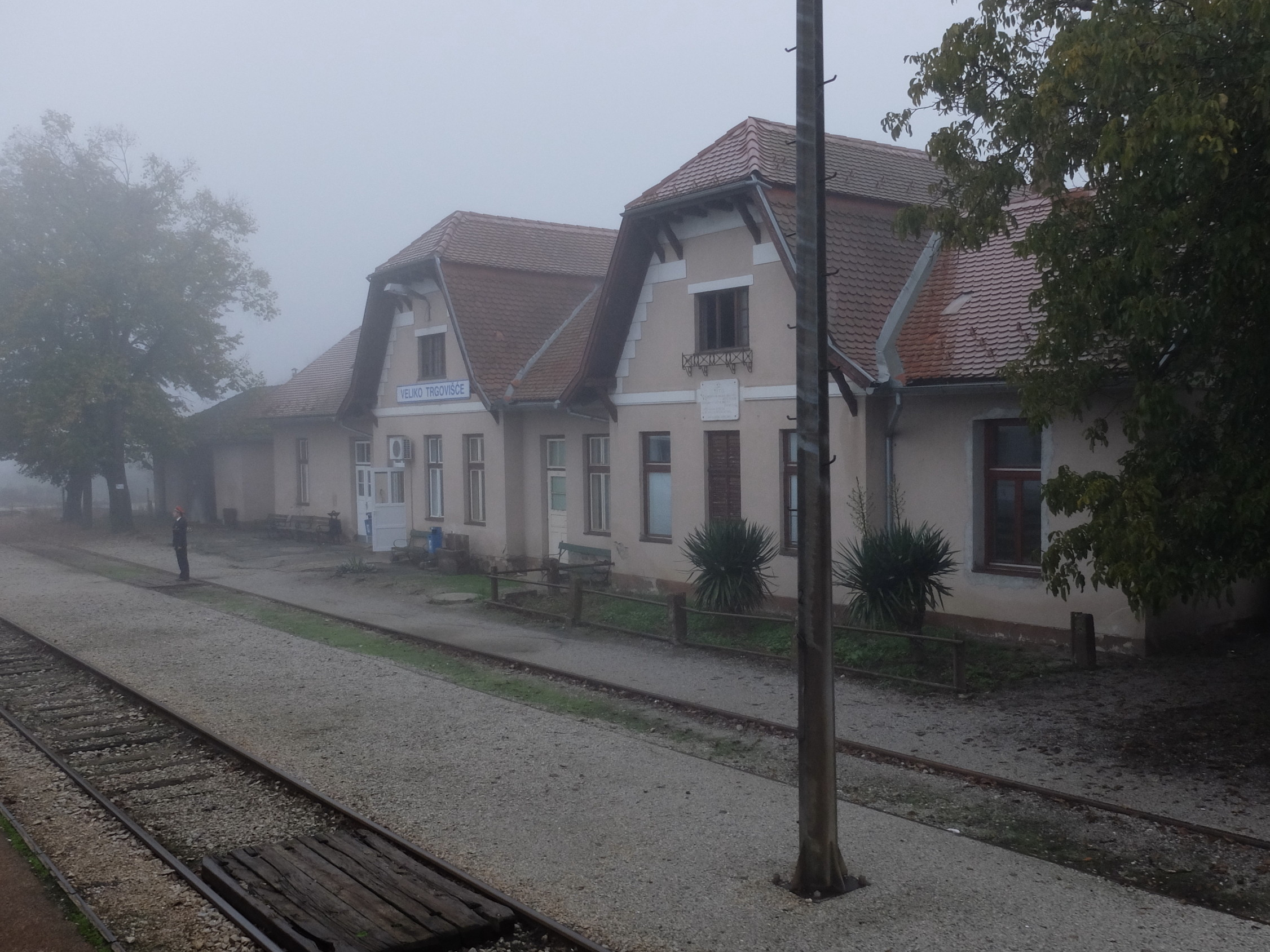
Veliko Trgovišće railway station

== Demographics ==
In the 2021 census, there were a total of 4,448 inhabitants in the municipality, in the following settlements:

- Bezavina, population 80
- Domahovo, population 295
- Družilovec, population 400
- Dubrovčan, population 742
- Jalšje, population 301
- Jezero Klanječko, population 190
- Mrzlo Polje, population 202
- Požarkovec, population 114
- Ravnice, population 302
- Strmec, population 148
- Turnišće Klanječko, population 49
- Velika Erpenja, population 83
- Veliko Trgovišće, population 1,193
- Vilanci, population 116
- Vižovlje, population 233
Veliko Trgovišće: Population trends 1857–2021
v

population	4036	4645	5009	5479	6004	6515	6368	6838	6765	6584	6194	5886	5717	5381	5220	4945	4448
	1857	1869	1880	1890	1900	1910	1921	1931	1948	1953	1961	1971	1981	1991	2001	2011	2021

Sources: Croatian Bureau of Statistics publications

== Administration ==
The current mayor of Veliko Trgovišće is Robert Greblički and the Veliko Trgovišće Municipal Council consists of 13 seats.

Groups	Councilors per group
Independents	9 / 13
HDZ	3 / 13
SDP	1 / 13

== Notable people ==
- Franjo Tuđman, first president of Croatia from 1990 until his death in 1999.
