= Kumrovec =

Village in Krapina-Zagorje County, Croatia

- Municipality
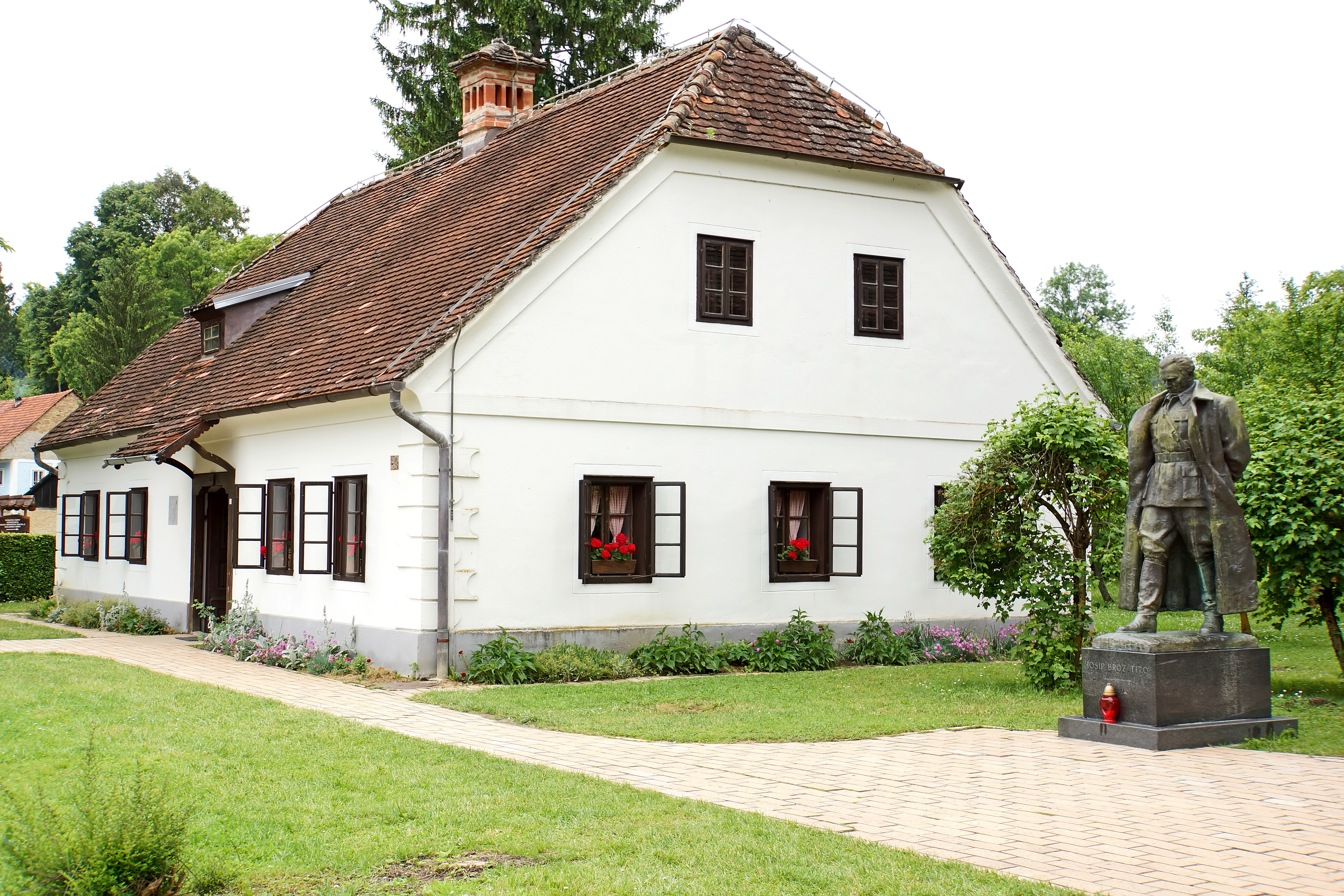
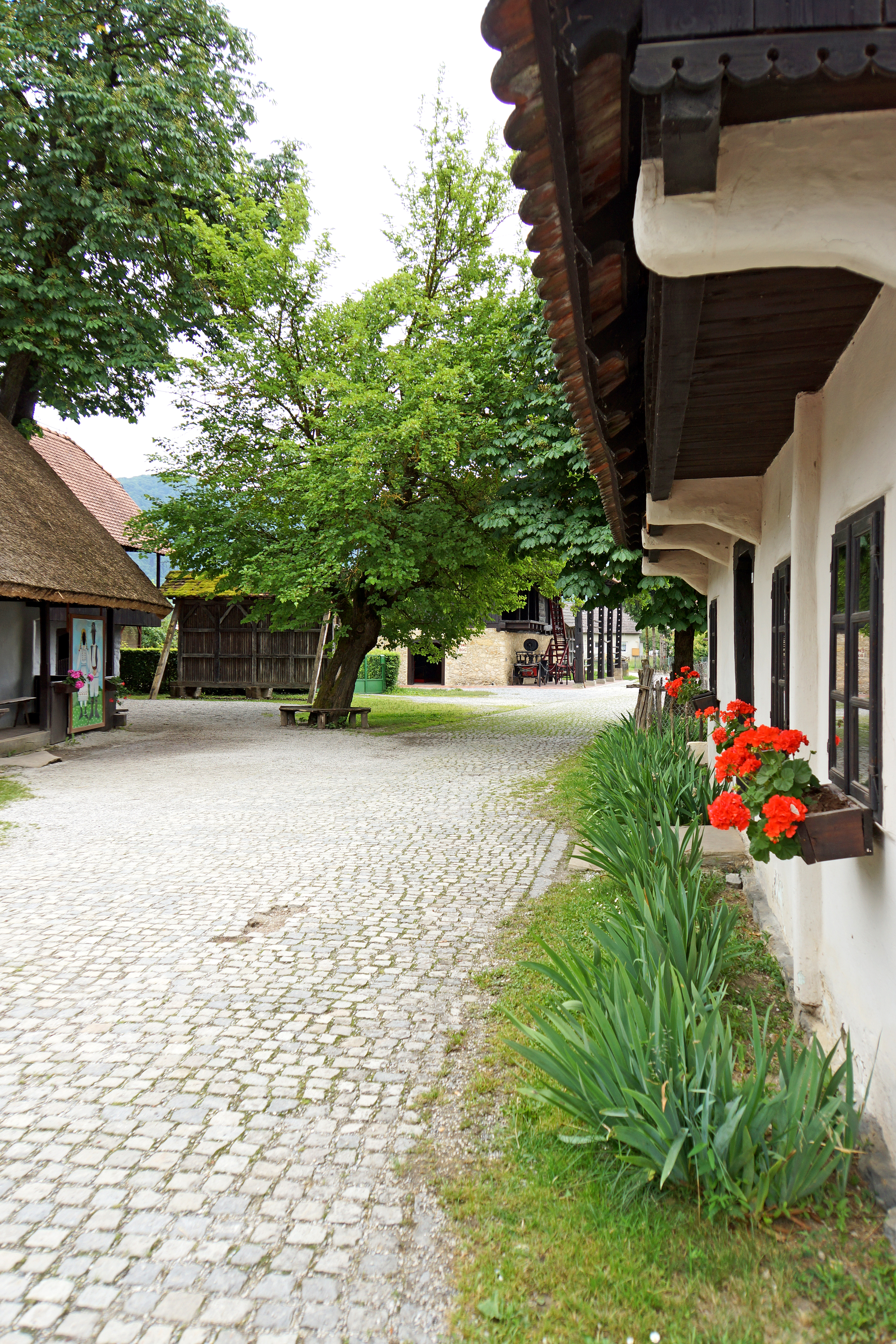
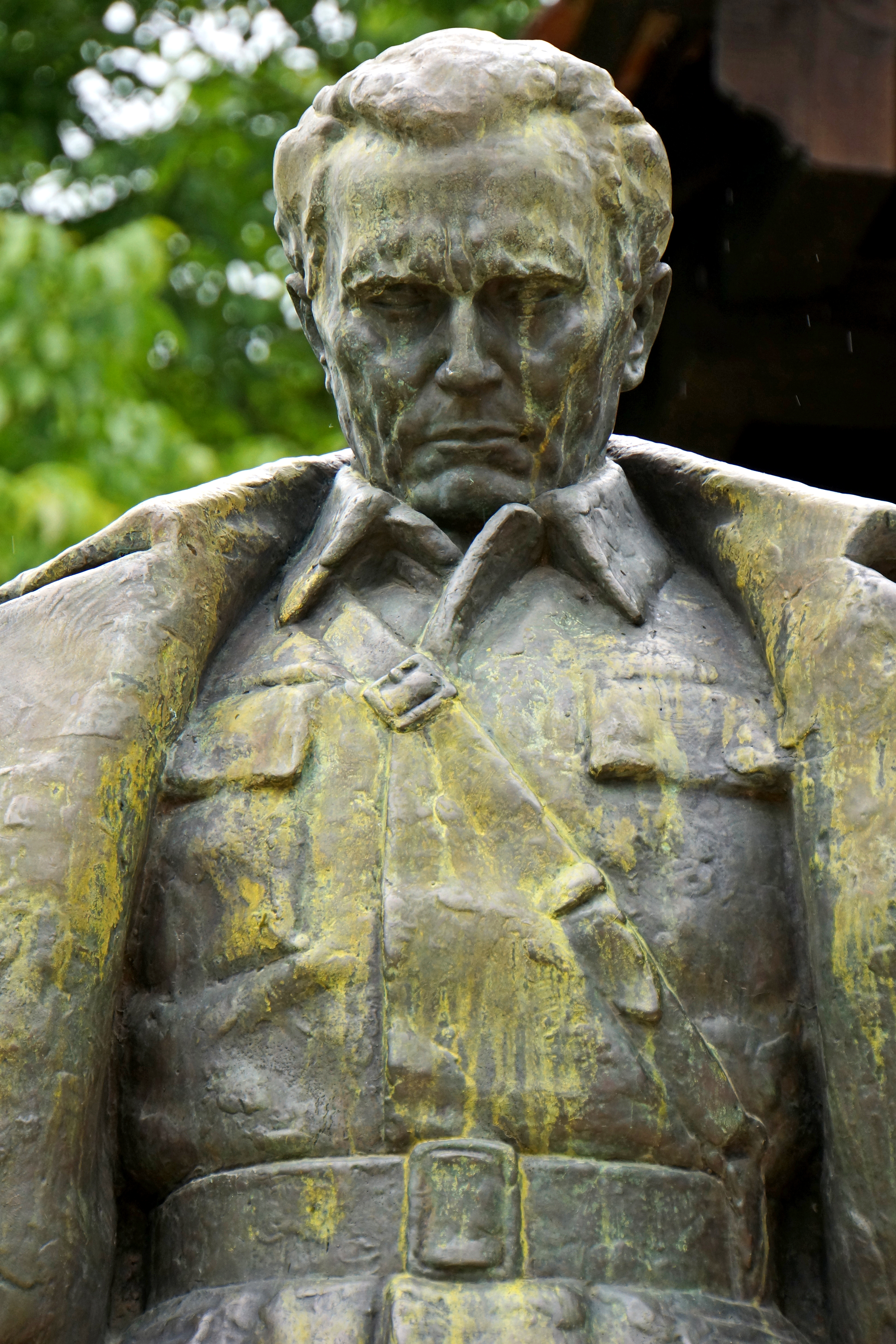
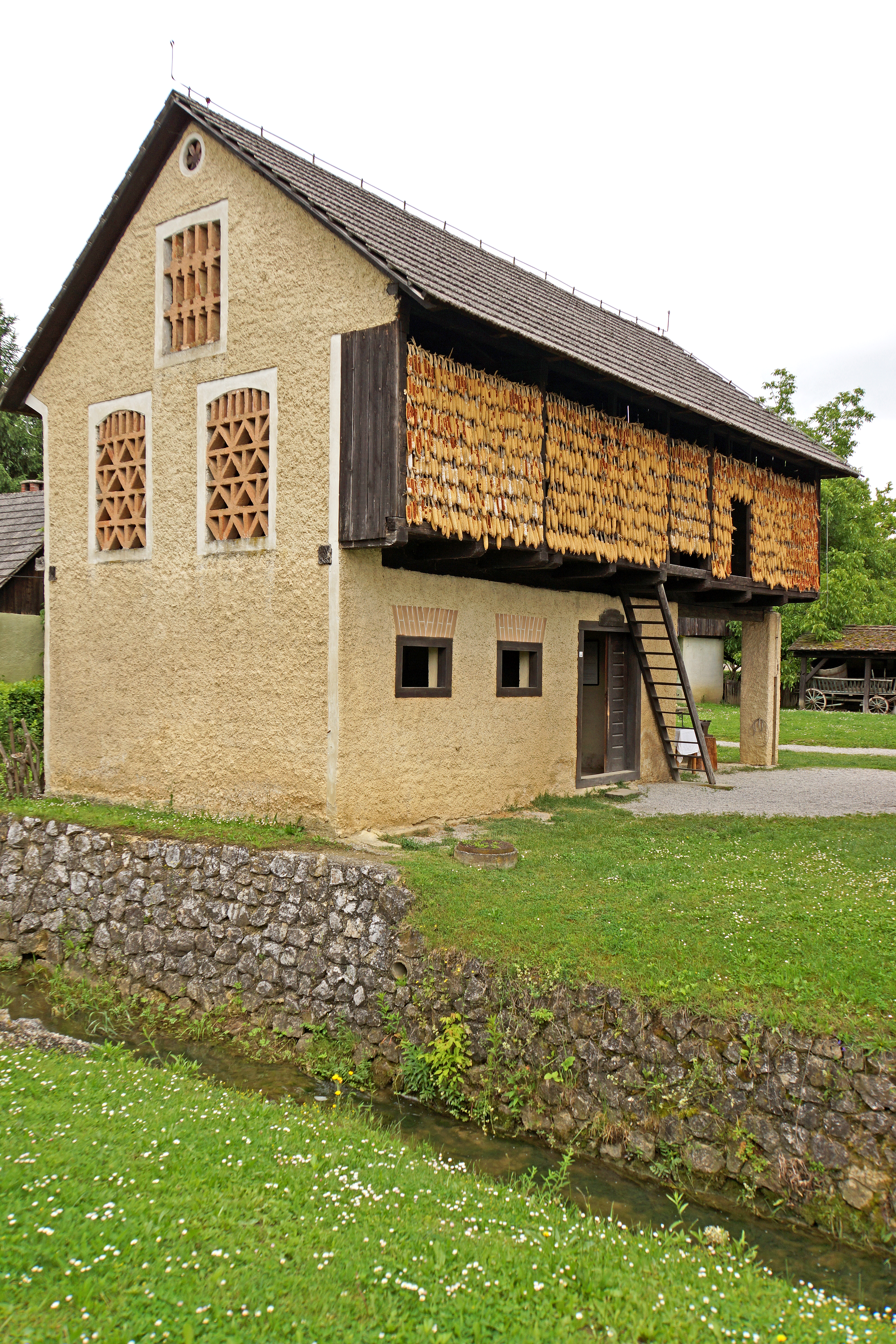
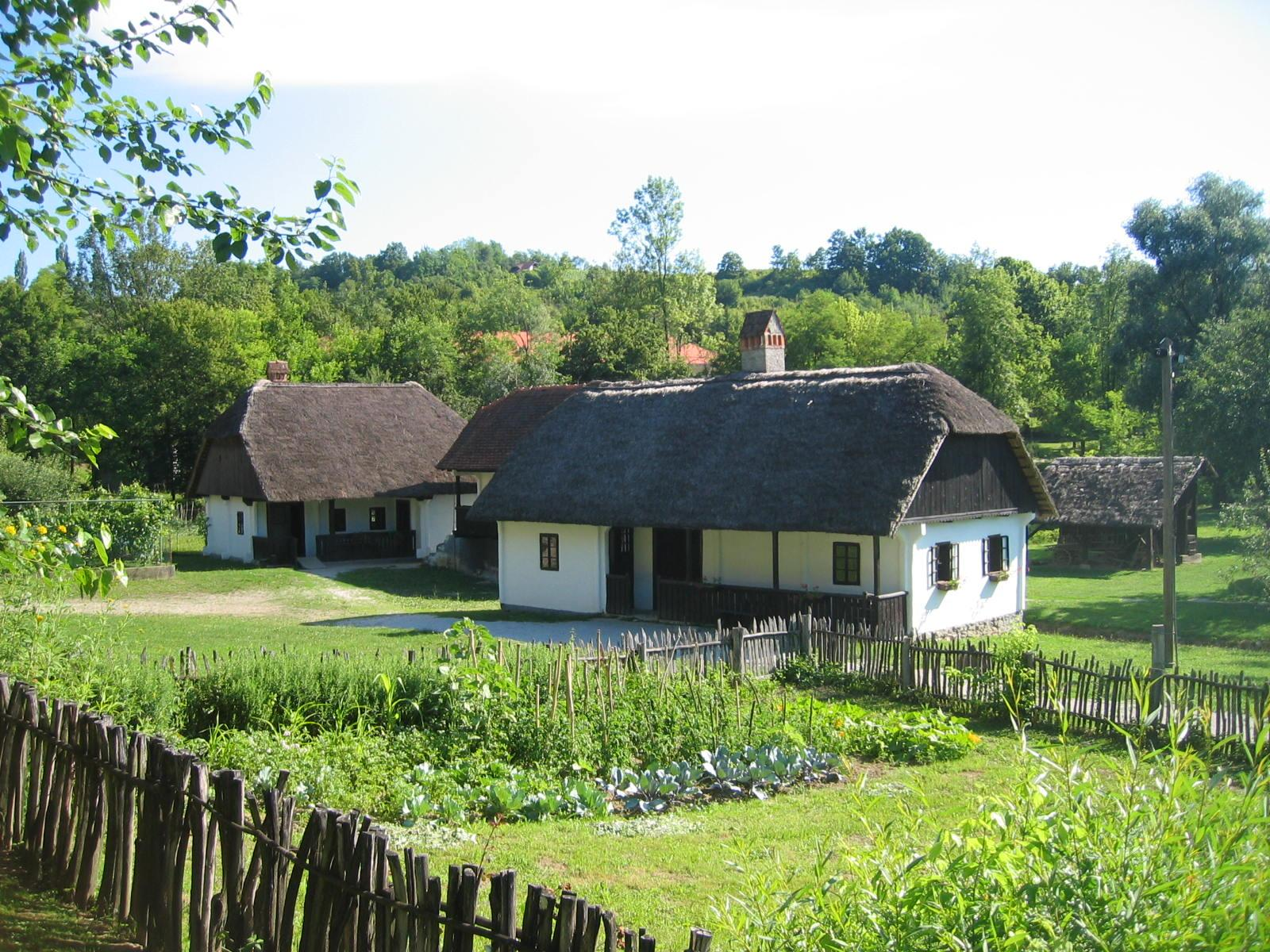
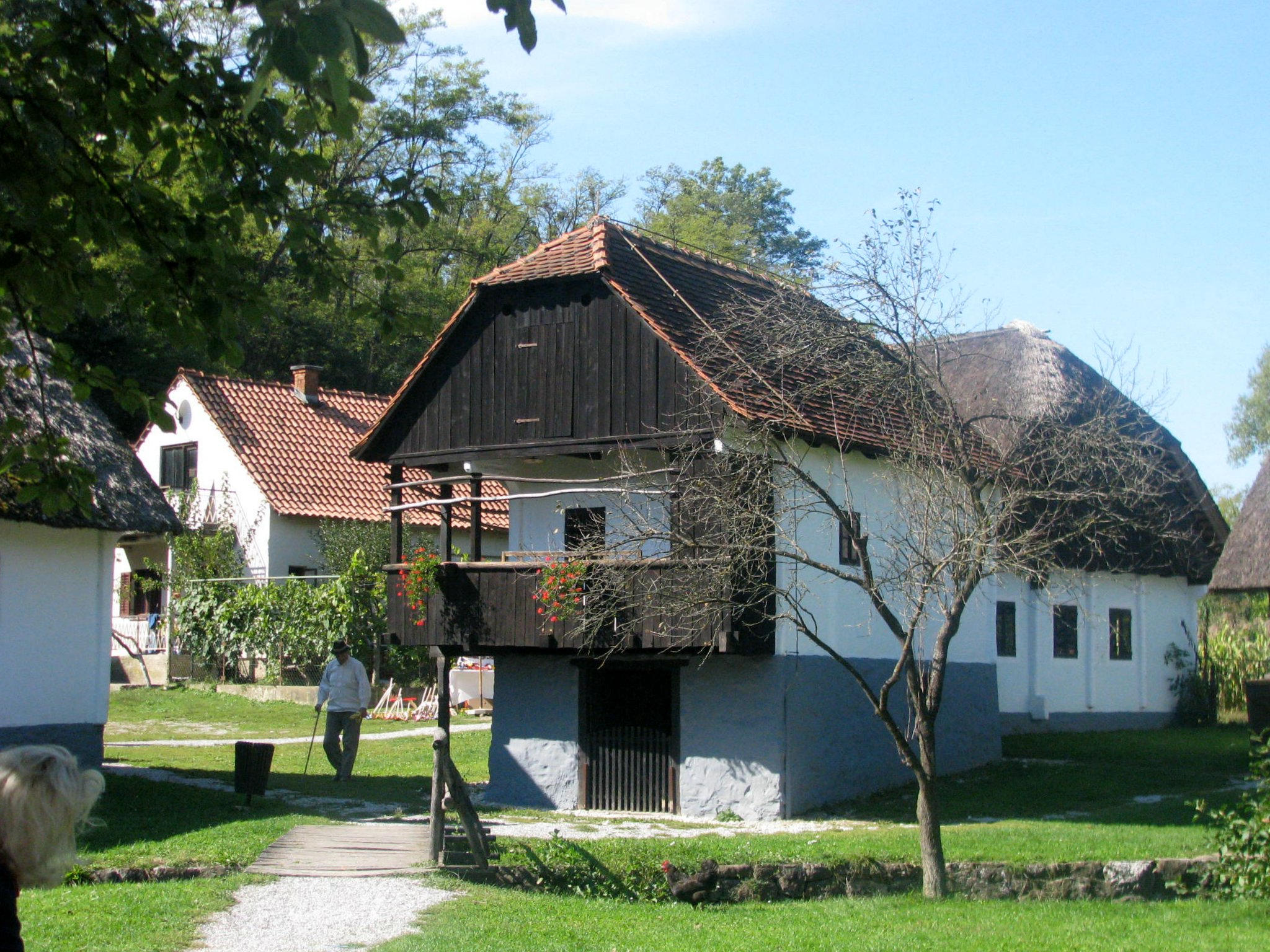

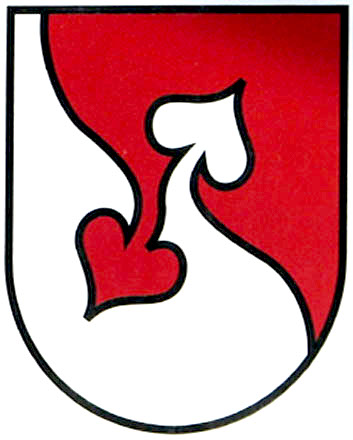
- Coat of arms

- Location within Croatia
- Coordinates: 46°5′8″N 15°40′40″E
- Country: Croatia
- County: Krapina-Zagorje County

Government
  - Mayor: Robert Šplajt (HNS)

Area
  - Municipality: 17.5 km^{2} (6.8 sq mi)
  - Urban: 2.1 km^{2} (0.81 sq mi)

Population (2021)
  - Municipality: 1,412
  - Density: 80.7/km^{2} (209/sq mi)
  - Urban: 245
  - Urban density: 120/km^{2} (300/sq mi)
- Time zone: UTC+1 (CET)
  - Summer (DST): UTC+2 (CEST)
- Website: kumrovec.hr

Kumrovec (Croatian pronunciation: [kûmroʋet͡s]) is a village in northern Croatia, part of Krapina-Zagorje County. It sits on the Sutla River, along the Croatian-Slovenian border. The Kumrovec municipality has 1,412 residents (2021), but the village itself has only 245 people. The municipality was established on May 6, 1997, after it was split from the municipality of Tuhelj.

Kumrovec is notably the birthplace of Josip Broz Tito (1892–1980), the president of former Yugoslavia. The birth house of Tito (built in 1860 as the first brickwork house in the village) features the Memorial Museum of Marshal Tito, opened in 1953. The museum is also important for the local folklore. Next to the house is the bronze standing statue of Marshal Tito (made by Antun Augustinčić, 1948). The old part of Kumrovec comprises the Ethnological Museum with 18 village houses, displaying permanent exhibitions of artifacts related to the life and work of Zagorje peasants in the 19th/20th century. The village is small but of great popularity in the former Yugoslavia, owing to the annual celebration of Youth Day every May 25.

An attraction in Kumrovec is the Ethnological Museum Staro Selo (Old Village) Kumrovec, which features village houses from the turn of the 19th and 20th centuries. The reconstruction and redecoration of these houses started in 1977. So far, around 40 houses and other farmstead facilities have been restored. Visitors may see permanent ethnological exhibitions such as the Zagorje-style Wedding, the Life of Newly-weds, From Hemp to Linen, Blacksmith's Crafts, Cart-wright's Craft, Pottery, and From Grain to Bread.

On November 24, 1935, the Brethren of the Croatian Dragon raised a monument to the Croatian anthem Lijepa naša domovino to celebrate its one hundredth anniversary. Kumrovec celebrates this day as its municipal holiday.

== History ==
In the late 19th and early 20th century, Kumrovec was part of Varaždin County of the Kingdom of Croatia-Slavonia.

According to the research of Slovenian historian Daniel Siter, during the initial phase of the German occupation of the Slovene-Croatian territory between May and June 1941, the municipality of Kumrovec was temporarily occupied by Nazi Germany, along with other parts of the western outskirts of the Croatian Zagorje (Hum na Sotli, Prišlin, Druškovec, Brezno and Lupinjak). For the first few weeks after the occupation in April, the swastika also hung in Kumrovec. The occupied territory of Western Croatian Zagorje (including Kumrovec) was returned to the Independent State of Croatia in mid-June 1941. At that time, the state and occupation border between Germany and Croatia was finally established along the water line of the Sotla river.

== Culture ==
The municipality is home to the cultural organization KUD Kumrovec. It has two Catholic chapels: Kapela sv. Rok built in 1963 and Kapela Majke Božje Snježne built in 1639.

== Demographics ==
According to the 2021 census, the municipality had a total population of 1,412 in ten separate settlements:

- Donji Škrnik, population 148
- Dugnjevec, population 65
- Kladnik, population 110
- Kumrovec, population 245
- Podgora, population 34
- Ravno Brezje, population 202
- Razdrto Tuheljsko, population 74
- Razvor, population 186
- Risvica, population 258
- Velinci, population 90
Kumrovec: Population trends 1857–2021
v

population	1999	2248	2425	2596	2616	2920	2778	2739	2595	2459	2246	2174	1981	1914	1854	1588	1412
	1857	1869	1880	1890	1900	1910	1921	1931	1948	1953	1961	1971	1981	1991	2001	2011	2021

Sources: Croatian Bureau of Statistics publications

== Administration ==
The current mayor of Kumrovec is Robert Šplajt (HNS) and the Kumrovec Municipal Council consists of 9 seats.

Groups	Councilors per group
HNS	6 / 9
Independents	2 / 9
HDZ	1 / 9

== Notable people ==
- Josip Broz Tito, Socialist leader of Yugoslavia from 1945 until his death in 1980

== Gallery ==
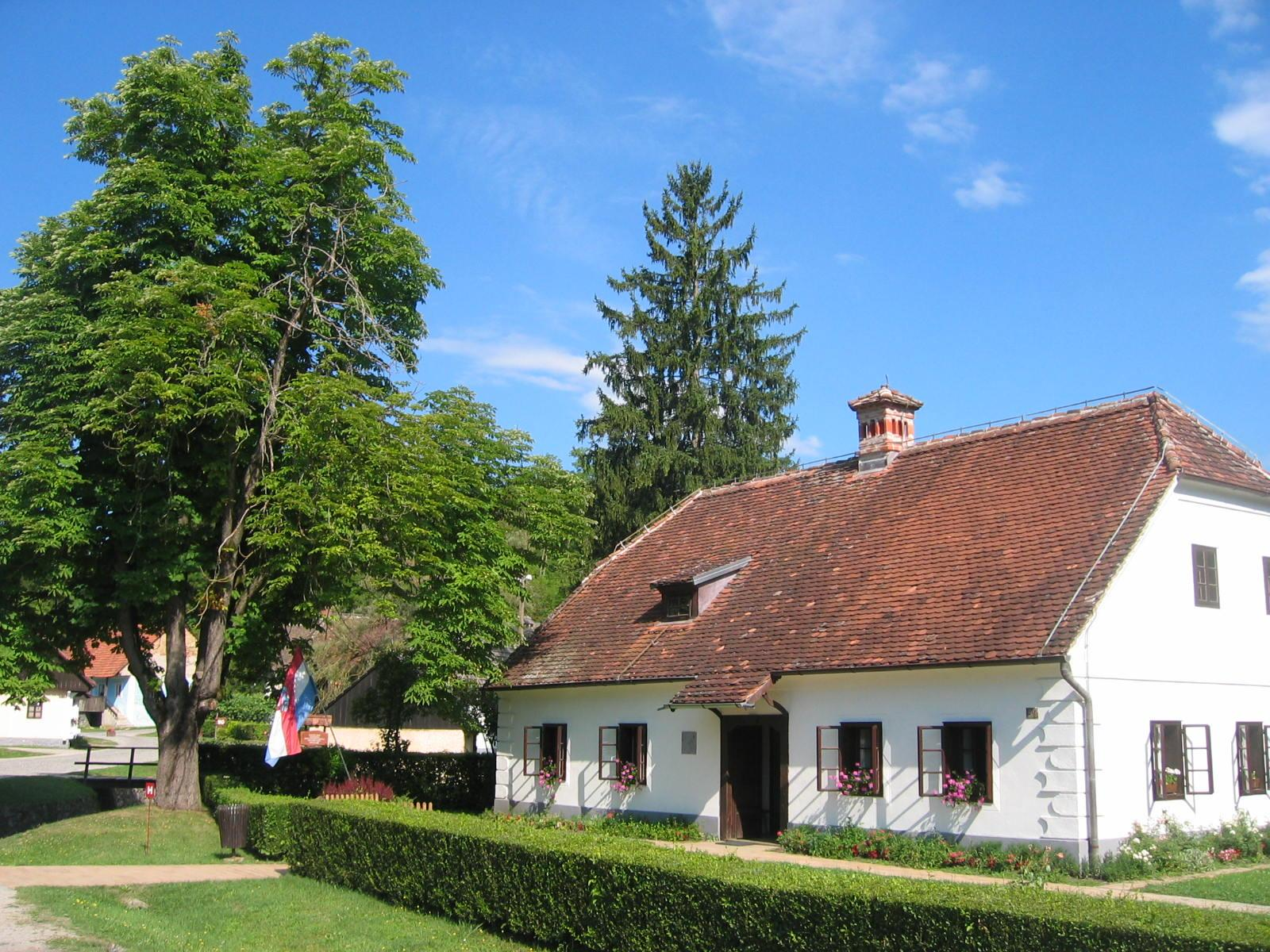
Marshal Tito's birth house

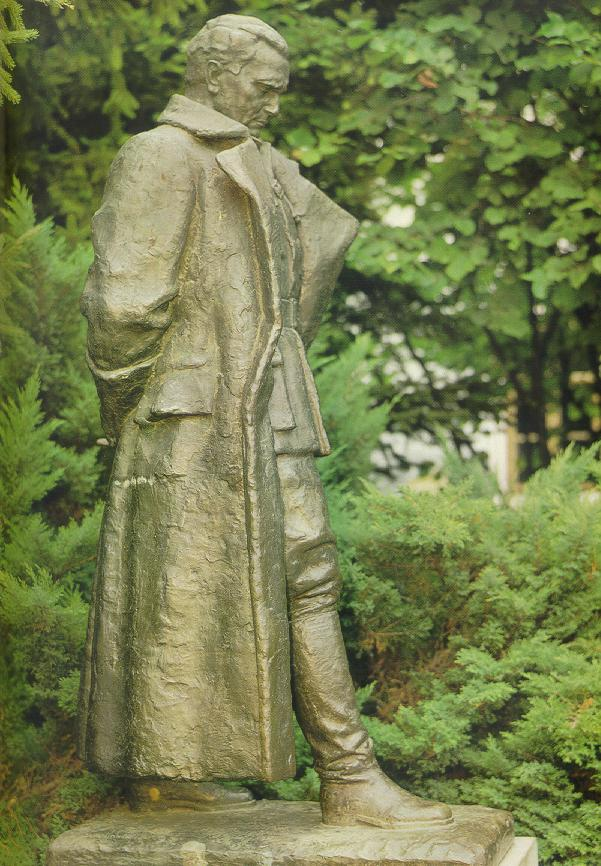
Tito's statue in Kumrovec, made by the sculptor Antun Augustinčić (1900-1979)

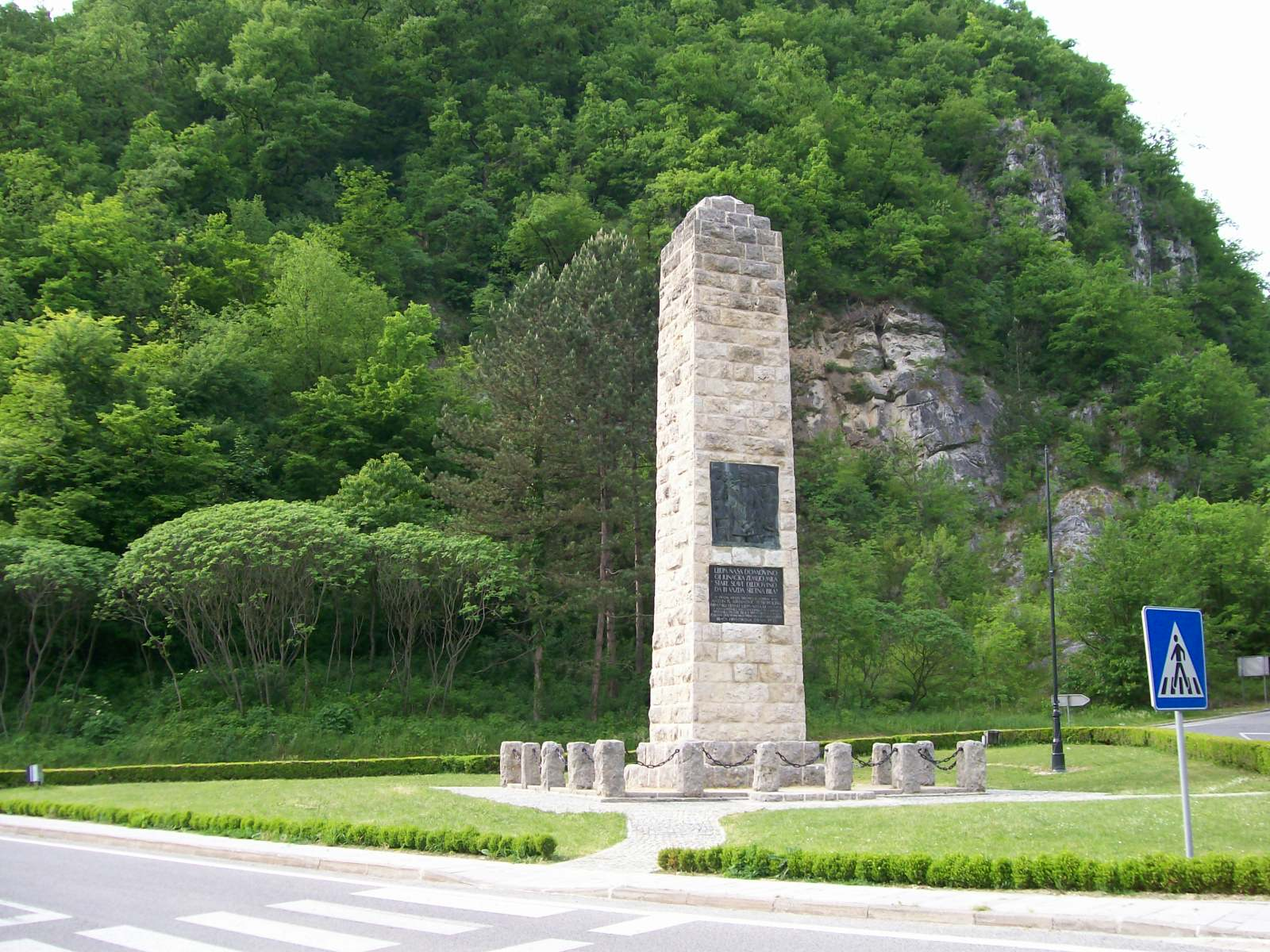
Monument to the Croatian anthem

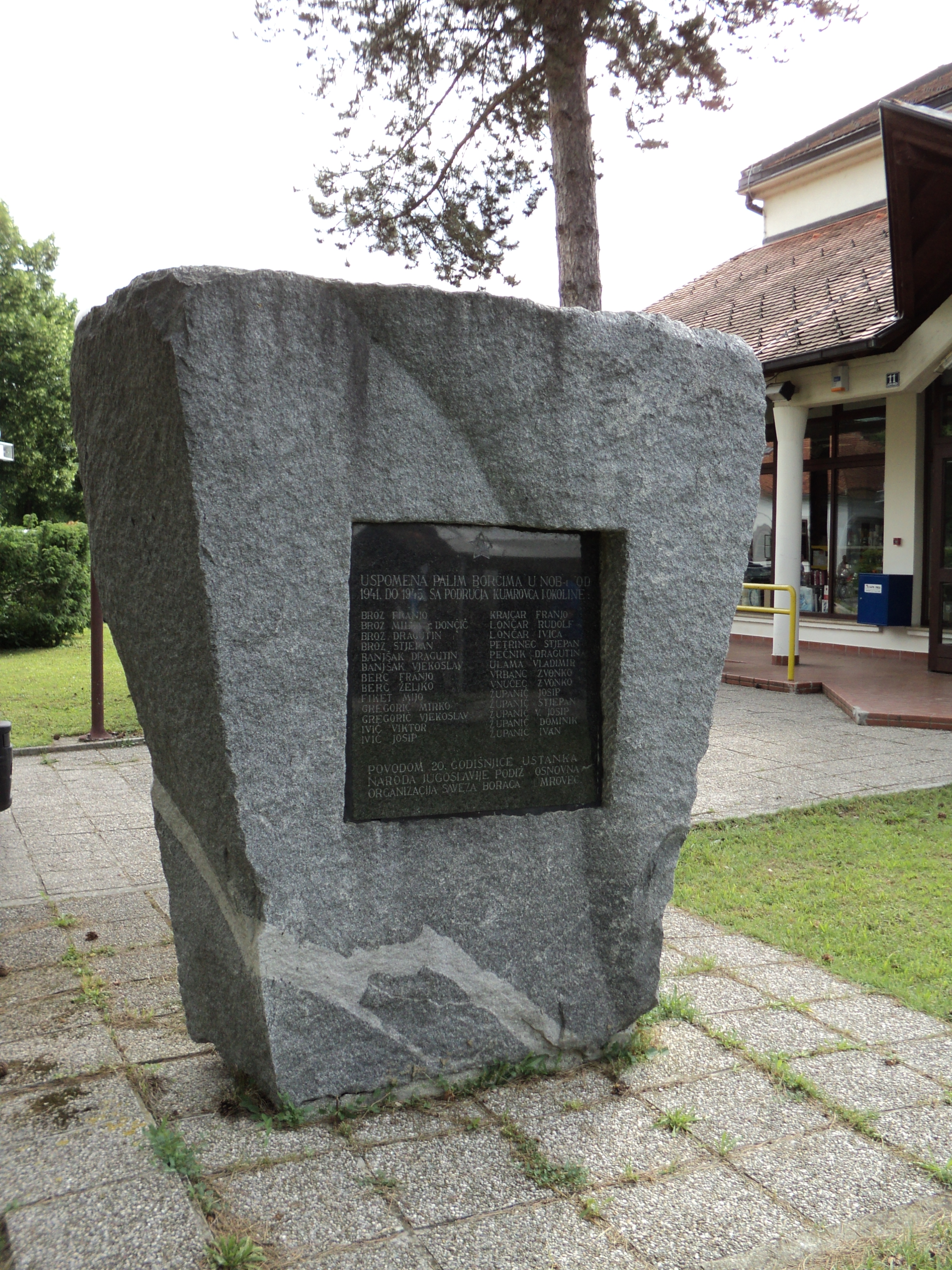
Monument to the fallen fighters of the National Liberation struggle in the area of Kumrovec

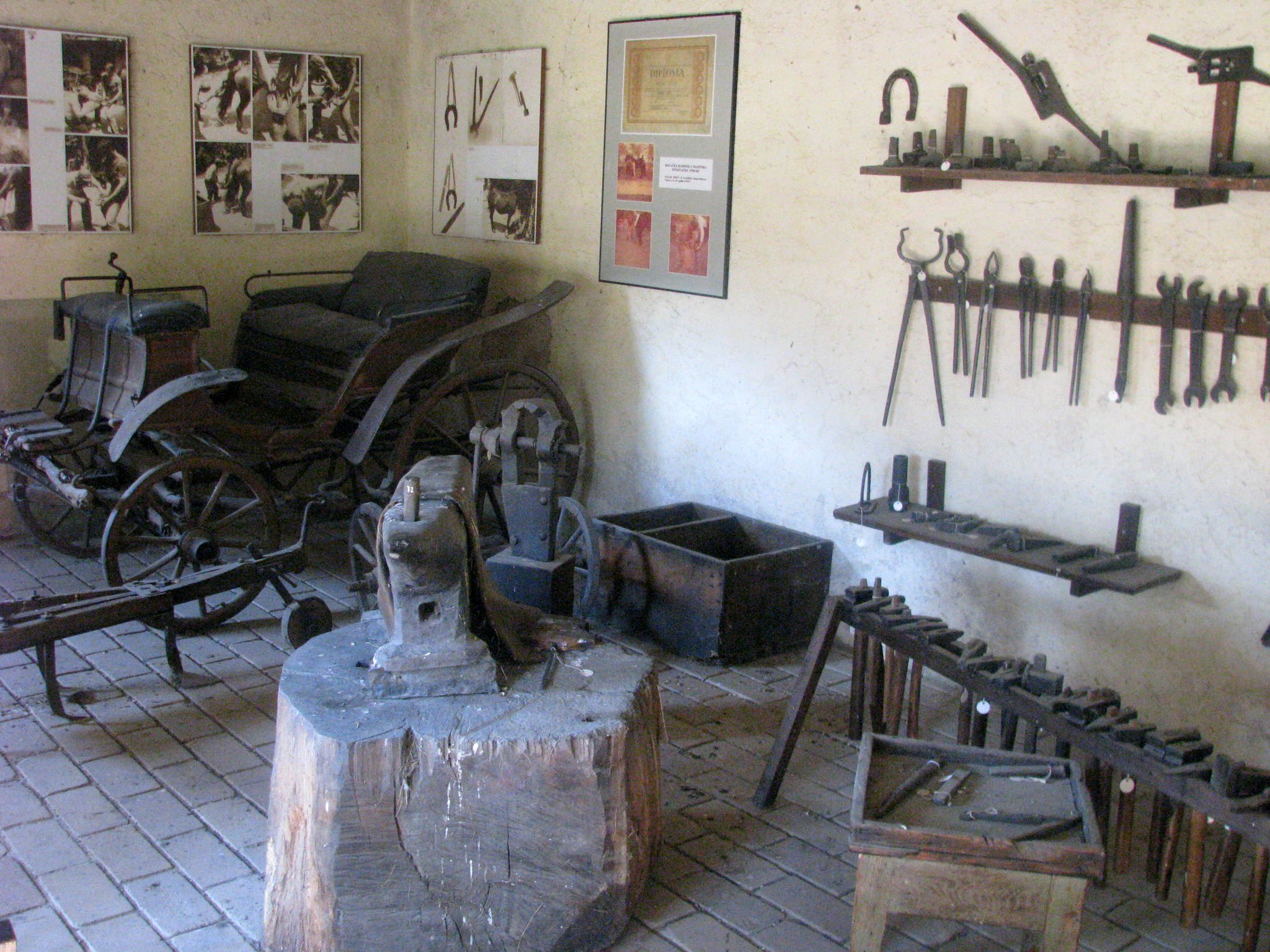
One of the scenes at the Ethnological Museum in Kumrovec

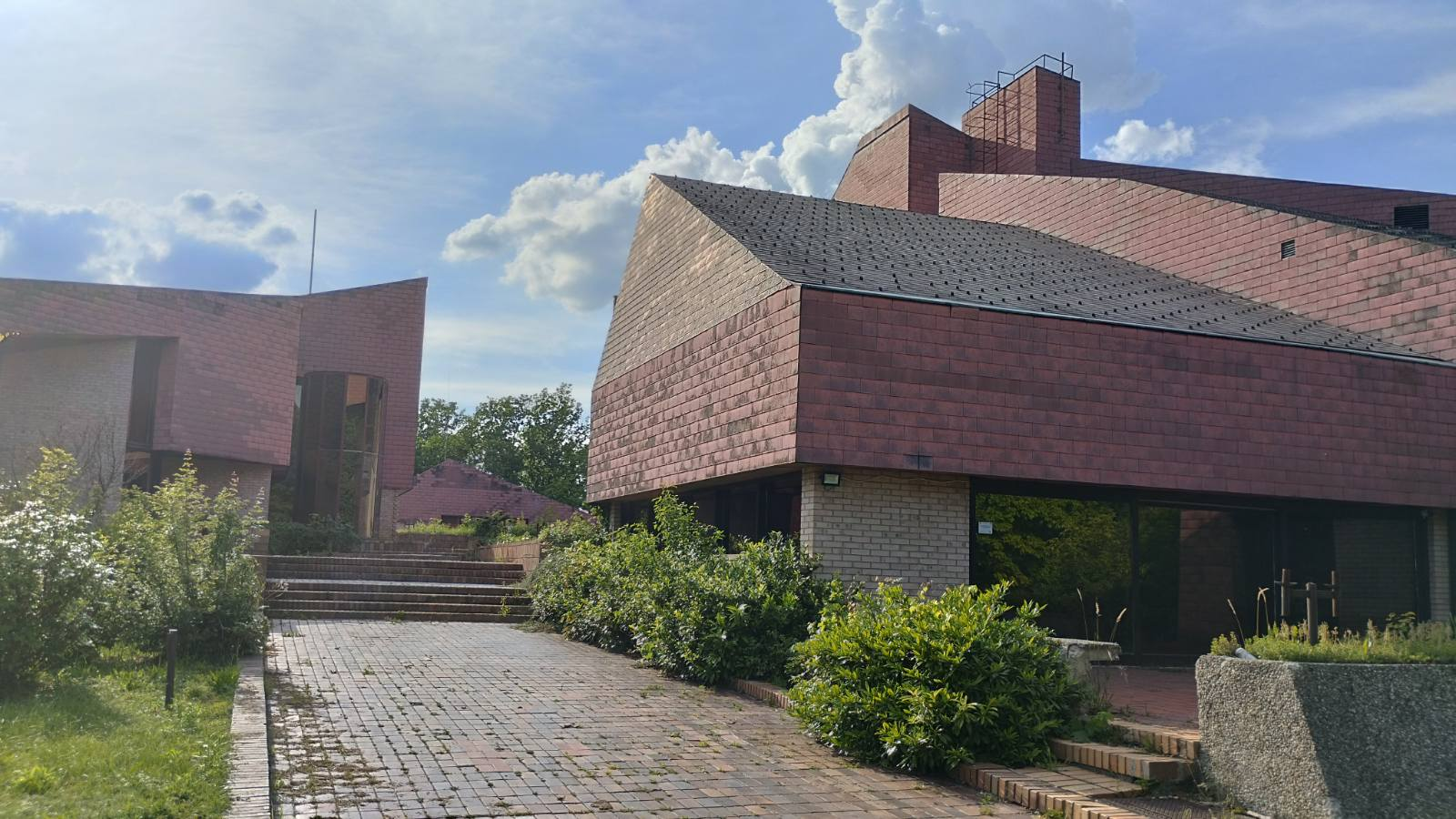
Former Communist Party of Yugoslavia political school in Kumrovec.
