= Mihanovićev Dol =

Coordinates: 46°03′00″N 15°43′43″E

- Village
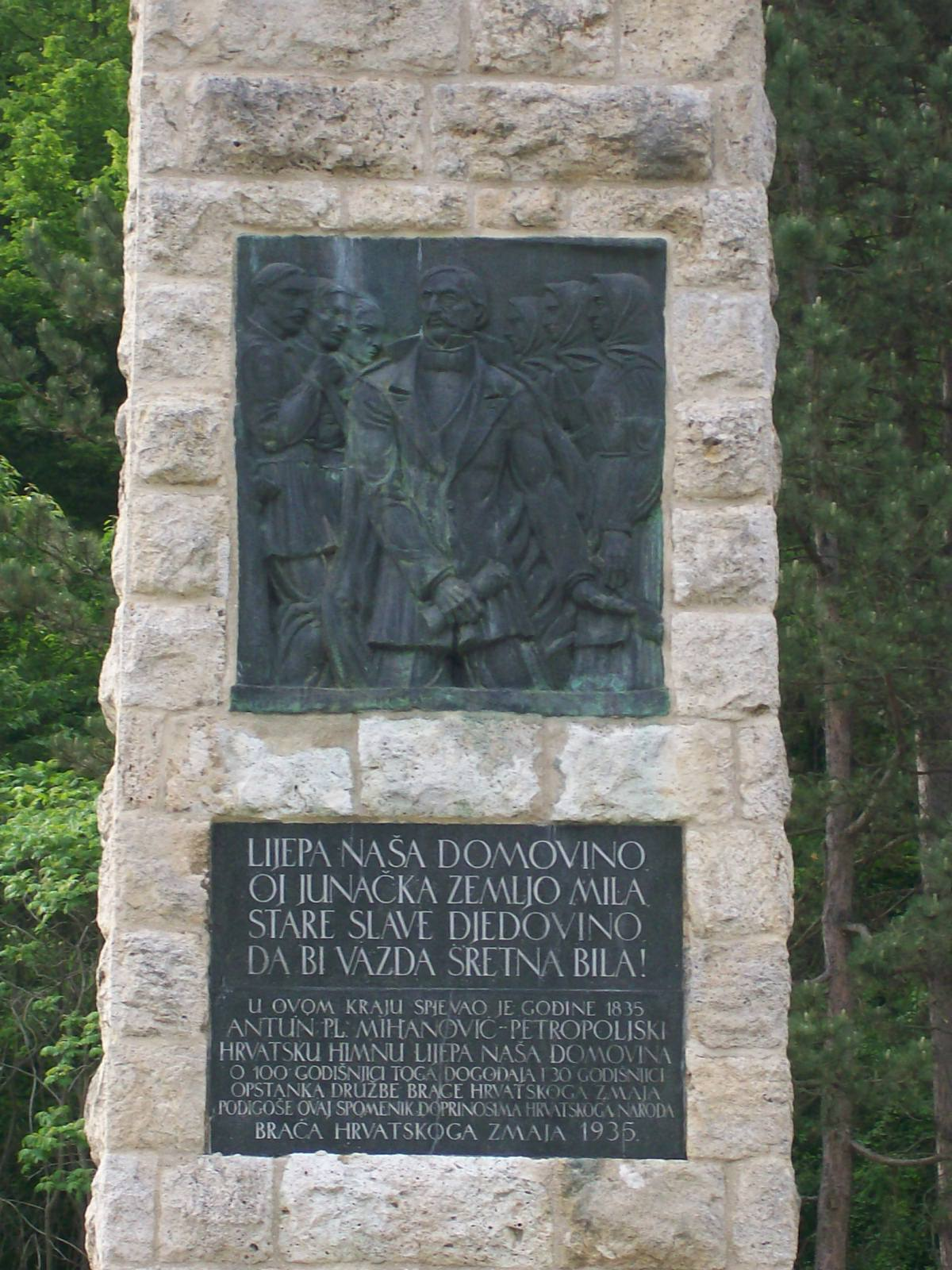
- Croatian anthem monument
- Interactive map of Mihanovićev Dol
- Country: Croatia
- County: Krapina-Zagorje County
- Town: Klanjec

Area
  - Total: 1.3 km^{2} (0.50 sq mi)

Population (2021)
  - Total: 265
  - Density: 200/km^{2} (530/sq mi)
- Time zone: UTC+1 (CET)
  - Summer (DST): UTC+2 (CEST)

Mihanovićev Dol is a village in Krapina-Zagorje County, Croatia. It is connected by the D205 highway.
