= Sveti Križ, Tuhelj =

Coordinates: 46°03′38″N 15°46′02″E

Sveti Križ
- Village
- Interactive map of Sveti Križ
- Country: Croatia
- County: Krapina-Zagorje County
- Municipality: Tuhelj

Area
  - Total: 3.6 km^{2} (1.4 sq mi)

Population (2021)
  - Total: 424
  - Density: 120/km^{2} (310/sq mi)
- Time zone: UTC+1 (CET)
  - Summer (DST): UTC+2 (CEST)

Sveti Križ is a village in Croatia. It is connected by the D205 highway.
