= Ravanica (disambiguation) =

Ravanica is a Serbian Orthodox monastery on Kučaj mountains near Ćuprija in Central Serbia.

Ravanica may also refer to:

- Vrdnik-Ravanica Monastery, a Serb Orthodox monastery in Vrdnik in the Fruška Gora mountains in the northern Serbia, in the province of Vojvodina
- Ravanica (Kraljevo), a village in Kraljevo municipality in Serbia

== See also ==
- Ravnica (disambiguation)
- Ravašnica
