= Ravnica =

Ravnica may refer to:

- Ravnica (Magic: The Gathering), a block of the trading card game Magic: The Gathering
- Ravnica, Prozor, a village in central Bosnia and Herzegovina
- Ravnica, Radovljica, a settlement in the Upper Carniola region of Slovenia
- Ravnica, Nova Gorica, a village in western Slovenia
- Ravnica, Croatia, a village near Ribnik

== See also ==
- Return to Ravnica, a further block of Magic: The Gathering
- Ravanica (disambiguation)
- Ravnice (disambiguation)
