= Dol Klanječki =

Coordinates: 46°03′00″N 15°45′11″E

- Village
- Interactive map of Dol Klanječki
- Country: Croatia
- County: Krapina-Zagorje County

Area
  - Total: 1.0 km^{2} (0.39 sq mi)

Population (2021)
  - Total: 96
  - Density: 96/km^{2} (250/sq mi)
- Time zone: UTC+1 (CET)
  - Summer (DST): UTC+2 (CEST)

Dol Klanječki is a village in Croatia. It is connected by the D205 highway.
