= Pristava, Tuhelj =

Coordinates: 46°04′31″N 15°44′04″E

Pristava
- Village
- Interactive map of Pristava
- Country: Croatia
- County: Krapina-Zagorje County
- Municipality: Tuhelj

Area
  - Total: 3.8 km^{2} (1.5 sq mi)

Population (2021)
  - Total: 230
  - Density: 61/km^{2} (160/sq mi)
- Time zone: UTC+1 (CET)
  - Summer (DST): UTC+2 (CEST)

Pristava is a village in Croatia.
