= Plavić =

Coordinates: 46°07′N 15°37′E

- Village
- Interactive map of Plavić
- Country: Croatia
- County: Krapina-Zagorje County

Area
  - Total: 2.6 km^{2} (1.0 sq mi)

Population (2021)
  - Total: 140
  - Density: 54/km^{2} (140/sq mi)
- Time zone: UTC+1 (CET)
  - Summer (DST): UTC+2 (CEST)

Plavić is a village in Croatia.
