= Dubrovčan =

Coordinates: 46°02′N 15°48′E

- Village
- Interactive map of Dubrovčan
- Country: Croatia
- County: Krapina-Zagorje County

Area
  - Total: 2.2 sq mi (5.7 km^{2})

Population (2021)
  - Total: 742
  - Density: 340/sq mi (130/km^{2})
- Time zone: UTC+1 (CET)
  - Summer (DST): UTC+2 (CEST)

Dubrovčan is a village in Croatia. It is connected by the D205 highway.
