= Tuhelj =

- Municipality
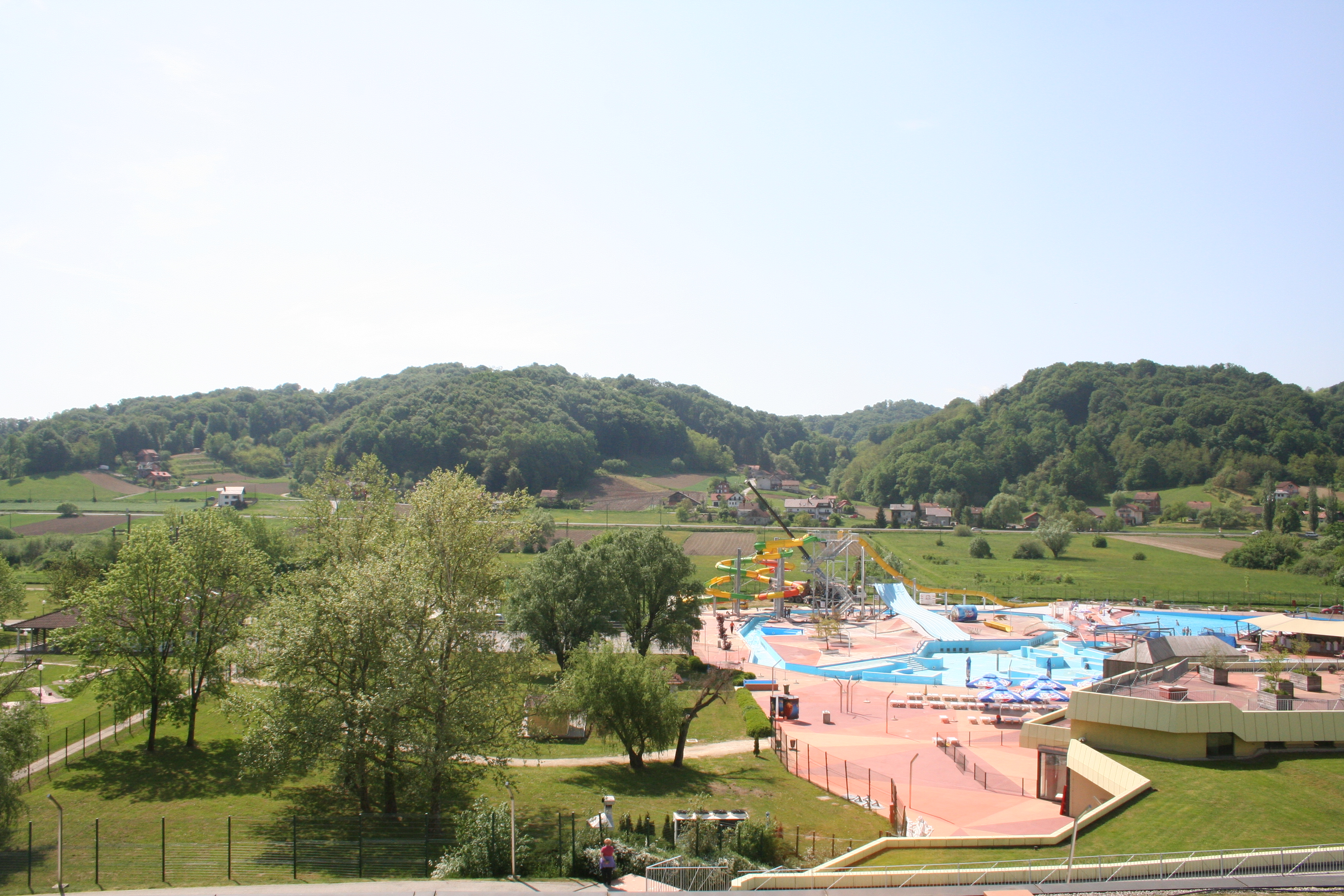
- Tuhelj Spa in 2018
- Interactive map of Tuhelj
- Location of Tuhelj within Croatia Tuhelj (Croatia)
- Coordinates: 46°04′36.84″N 15°44′49.92″E
- Country: Croatia
- County: Krapina-Zagorje County

Government
  - Mayor: Mladen Hercigonja (SDP)

Area
  - Municipality: 23.9 km^{2} (9.2 sq mi)
  - Urban: 1.4 km^{2} (0.54 sq mi)

Population (2021)
  - Municipality: 2,043
  - Density: 85.5/km^{2} (221/sq mi)
  - Urban: 195
  - Urban density: 140/km^{2} (360/sq mi)
- Time zone: UTC+1 (CET)
  - Summer (DST): UTC+2 (CEST)
- Postal code: 49215
- Website: tuhelj.hr

Tuhelj is a village and a municipality in the Krapina-Zagorje County, northern Croatia. It is famous for its spa.

== History ==
The name Tuhelj comes from the Old Slavic word "tuhl", which means pit. The parish church of the Assumption of the Blessed Virgin Mary in Tuhelj is over 600 years old. The first written mention of the parish of Tuhelj is found in a document of the Apostolic Tribunal in Rome dated 21 October 1402. In it, judge Adam Usk states that in Tuhelj there exists "the parish church of St. Mary of Tuhelj, which has a bell tower, a bell, a baptistery and a cemetery." After the last renovation of the church, it was blessed by the Archbishop of Zagreb, Josip Bozanić, on September 23, 2001. The parish church is home to a Crucifixion sculpture by Antun Augustinčić.

The Municipality of Tuhelj was formed in 1993 by the Law on the Areas of Counties, Cities and Municipalities in the Republic of Croatia.

== Demographics ==
In the 2021 census, there were a total of 2,043 inhabitants in the area, in the following settlements:

- Banska Gorica, population 26
- Črešnjevec, population 264
- Glogovec Zagorski, population 72
- Lenišće, population 108
- Lipnica Zagorska, population 71
- Pristava, population 230
- Prosenik, population 191
- Sveti Križ, population 424
- Trsteno, population 124
- Tuhelj, population 195
- Tuheljske Toplice, population 338

In the same census, the majority of the population were Croats at 94.27%.

Tuhelj: Population trends 1857–2021
v

population	2471	2816	2903	3339	3444	3755	3514	3680	3780	3515	2947	2708	2250	2161	2181	2104	2043
	1857	1869	1880	1890	1900	1910	1921	1931	1948	1953	1961	1971	1981	1991	2001	2011	2021

Sources: Croatian Bureau of Statistics publications

== Administration ==
The current mayor of Tuhelj is Mladen Hercigonja and the Tuhelj Municipal Council consists of 9 seats.

Groups	Councilors per group
SDP	7 / 9
HDZ	2 / 9
