= Lepajci =

Coordinates: 46°07′N 15°54′E

- Village
- Interactive map of Lepajci
- Country: Croatia

Area
  - Total: 1.5 km^{2} (0.58 sq mi)

Population (2021)
  - Total: 354
  - Density: 240/km^{2} (610/sq mi)
- Time zone: UTC+1 (CET)
  - Summer (DST): UTC+2 (CEST)

Lepajci is a village in Croatia. It is connected by the D1 highway.
