= Gubaševo =

Coordinates: 46°01′12″N 15°51′36″E

- Village
- Interactive map of Gubaševo
- Country: Croatia
- County: Krapina-Zagorje County

Area
  - Total: 3.3 km^{2} (1.3 sq mi)

Population (2021)
  - Total: 258
  - Density: 78/km^{2} (200/sq mi)
- Time zone: UTC+1 (CET)
  - Summer (DST): UTC+2 (CEST)

Gubaševo is a village in Croatia. It is connected by the D1 highway.
