= Ravnice Desinićke =

Coordinates: 46°05′56″N 15°41′49″E

Ravnice Desinićka
- Village
- Interactive map of Ravnice Desinićka
- Country: Croatia

Area
  - Total: 0.89 sq mi (2.3 km^{2})

Population (2021)
  - Total: 151
  - Density: 170/sq mi (66/km^{2})
- Time zone: UTC+1 (CET)
  - Summer (DST): UTC+2 (CEST)

Ravnice Desinićka is a village in Croatia.
