= Ravnice, Krapina-Zagorje County =

Coordinates: 46°01′16″N 15°47′20″E

Ravnice
- Village
- Interactive map of Ravnice
- Country: Croatia
- County: Krapina-Zagorje County
- Municipality: Veliko Trgovišće

Area
  - Total: 3.5 km^{2} (1.4 sq mi)

Population (2021)
  - Total: 302
  - Density: 86/km^{2} (220/sq mi)
- Time zone: UTC+1 (CET)
  - Summer (DST): UTC+2 (CEST)

Ravnice is a village in Croatia.
