= Razvor =

Coordinates: 46°04′52″N 15°39′54″E

- Village
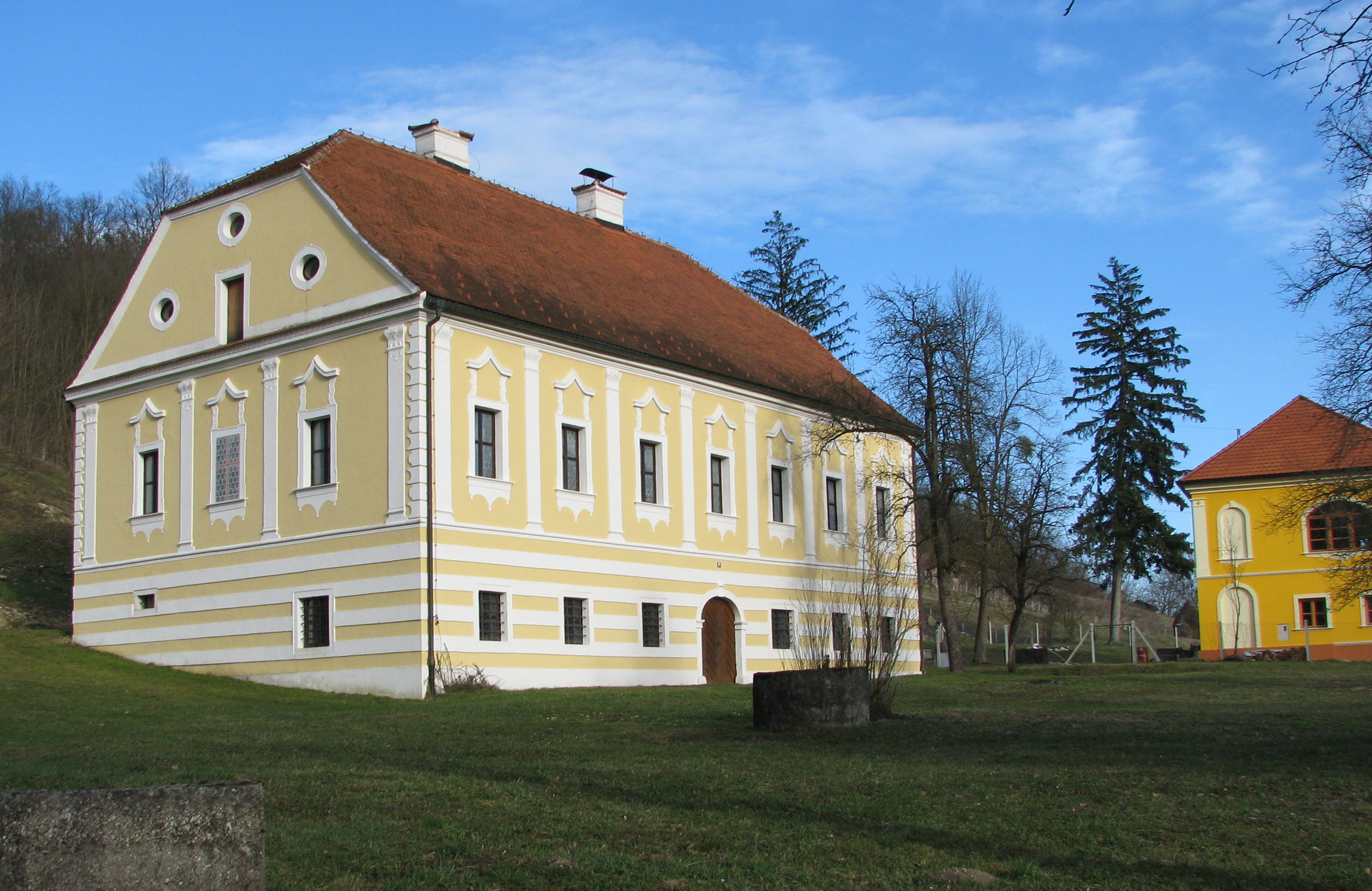
- Erdödy Manor in Razvor was built around 1780s.
- Interactive map of Razvor
- Country: Croatia
- County: Krapina-Zagorje County

Area
  - Total: 2.2 km^{2} (0.85 sq mi)

Population (2021)
  - Total: 186
  - Density: 85/km^{2} (220/sq mi)
- Time zone: UTC+1 (CET)
  - Summer (DST): UTC+2 (CEST)

Razvor is a village in Croatia. It is connected by the D205 highway.
