= Klanjec =

- Town
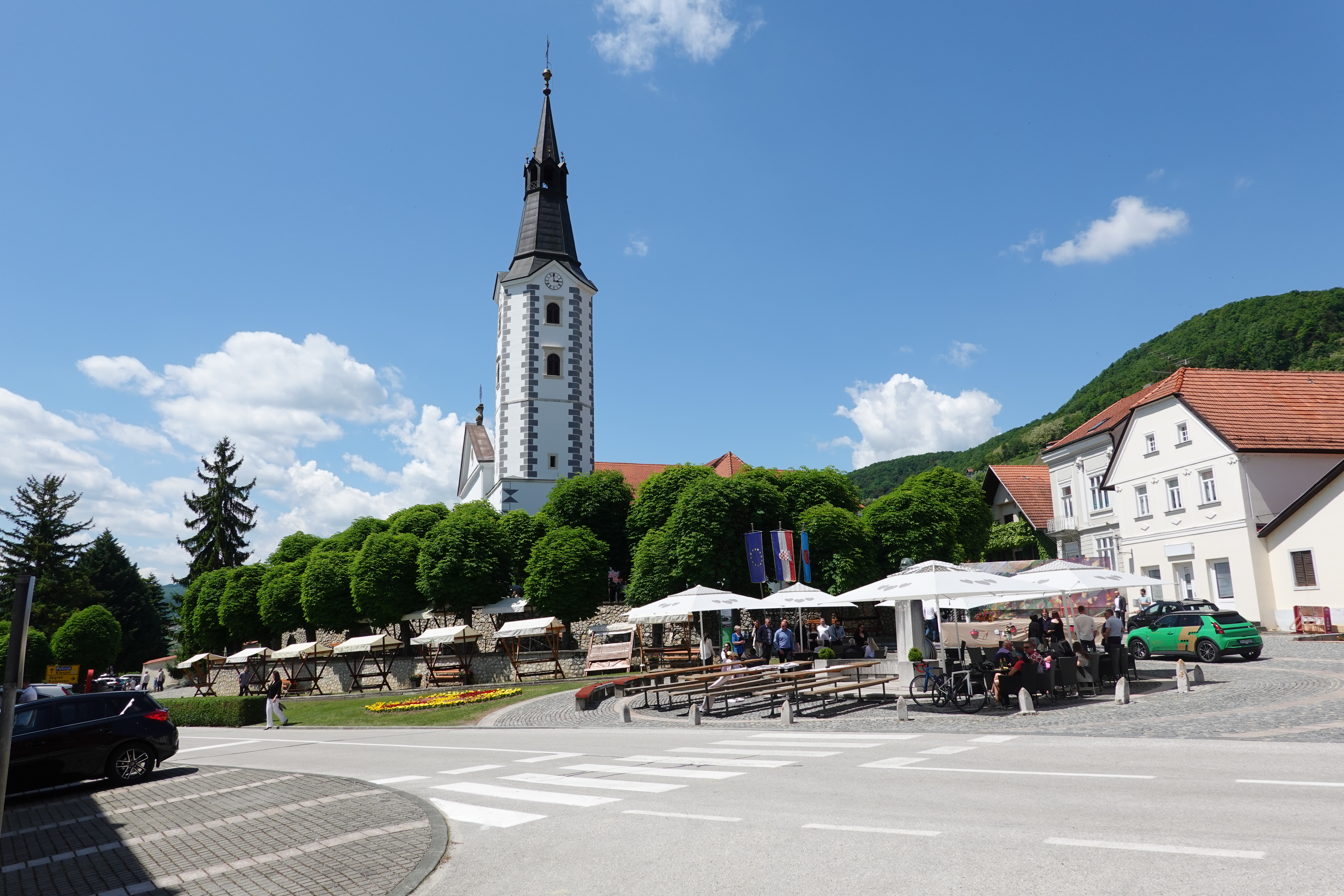

- Location of Klanjec in Croatia Klanjec (Croatia)
- Coordinates: 46°2′48″N 15°44′10″E
- Country: Croatia
- Region: Central Croatia (Hrvatsko Zagorje)
- County: Krapina-Zagorje County

Government
  - Mayor: Zlatko Brlek (SDP)

Area
  - Town: 25.6 km^{2} (9.9 sq mi)
  - Urban: 1.7 km^{2} (0.66 sq mi)

Population (2021)
  - Town: 2,548
  - Density: 99.5/km^{2} (258/sq mi)
  - Urban: 506
  - Urban density: 300/km^{2} (770/sq mi)
- Time zone: UTC+1 (Central European Time)
- Website: klanjec.hr

Klanjec (Croatian pronunciation: [klǎːɲet͡s]) is a small town in northwestern Croatia, in the region of Hrvatsko Zagorje on the border with Slovenia.

== History ==
Klanjec was founded as a suburb of the Cesargrad fortress. Cesargrad was first mentioned in sources in 1399. Klanjec first appears in historical documents in 1463, and the settlement got its name because of its location - at the entrance to the Zelenjak gorge (klanac). Eventually, Cesargrad came into the ownership of Toma Bakač Erdody. During the peasant uprisings of 1573, the fortress was first damaged when the commander of the peasant army, Ilija Gregorić, set it on fire. The development of the town was accelerated by the construction of the Franciscan monastery with the Church of the Annunciation of the Blessed Virgin Mary, which was built by Sigismund and Nikola Erdody.

As part of Varaždin County, it became the seat of a sub-county in 1851, and of a district in 1854. At the end of the 19th century, Klanjec had a population of slightly less than 700, had the status of a market town, and was still the seat of the district and the district court. In October 1886, through the efforts of the district judge Albert Jakopović, a reading room was founded in Klanjec. It operated until 1907, when the Reading Room of the Croatian Falcon was founded.

== Demographics ==
The population of the town of Klanjec is 2,548, but there are 506 people in the settlement itself. The absolute majority were Croats at 98%.

The town consists of the following settlements:

- Bobovec Tomaševečki, population 19
- Bratovski Vrh, population 30
- Cesarska Ves, population 11
- Dol Klanječki, population 96
- Florijan, population 6
- Goljak Klanječki, population 60
- Gorkovec, population 12
- Gredice, population 327
- Klanjec, population 506
- Ledine Klanječke, population 137
- Lepoglavec, population 141
- Letovčan Novodvorski, population 46
- Letovčan Tomaševečki, population 56
- Lučelnica Tomaševečka, population 182
- Mihanovićev Dol, population 265
- Novi Dvori Klanječki, population 207
- Police, population 192
- Rakovec Tomaševečki, population 109
- Tomaševec, population 146
Town of Klanjec: Population trends 1857–2021
v

population	3006	3163	3329	3730	3969	4153	3954	4129	4221	4225	3813	3806	3681	3537	3234	2915	2548
	1857	1869	1880	1890	1900	1910	1921	1931	1948	1953	1961	1971	1981	1991	2001	2011	2021

Sources: Croatian Bureau of Statistics publications

== Administration ==
The current mayor of Klanjec is Zlatko Brlek (SDP) and the Klanjec Town Council consists of 13 seats.

Groups	Councilors per group
SDP	6 / 13
Independents	2 / 13
HNS	2 / 13
HDZ	2 / 13
Nedjeljko Babić	1 / 13

== Sports ==
In mountaineering, its HPS chapter, HPD "Cesargrad", was founded on 11 November 1937. [

== Notable people ==
- Oton Iveković (1869-1939), Croatian painter
- Antun Augustinčić (1900-1979), Croatian sculptor
- Željko Kolar (1967), Croatian politician and prefect of the Krapina-Zagorje County

== International relations ==
=== Twin towns – Sister cities ===
Klanjec is twinned with:

- Wilamowice, Poland
