= Risvica =

Coordinates: 46°04′05″N 15°42′04″E

- Village
- Interactive map of Risvica
- Country: Croatia
- County: Krapina-Zagorje County

Area
  - Total: 2.7 km^{2} (1.0 sq mi)

Population (2021)
  - Total: 258
  - Density: 96/km^{2} (250/sq mi)
- Time zone: UTC+1 (CET)
  - Summer (DST): UTC+2 (CEST)

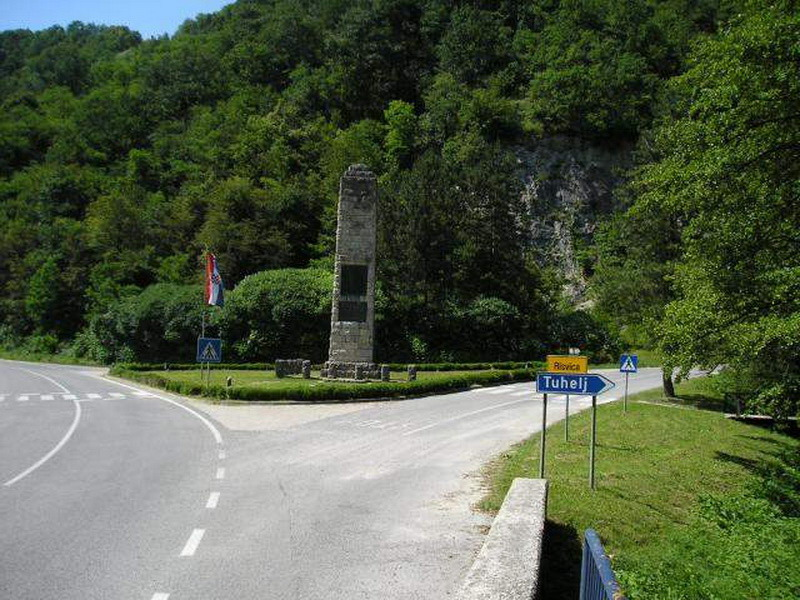
Risvica

Risvica is a village in Croatia. It is connected by the D205 highway.
