= Jalšje =

Coordinates: 46°02′24″N 15°51′00″E

- Village
- Interactive map of Jalšje
- Country: Croatia
- County: Krapina-Zagorje County

Area
  - Total: 3.3 km^{2} (1.3 sq mi)

Population (2021)
  - Total: 301
  - Density: 91/km^{2} (240/sq mi)
- Time zone: UTC+1 (CET)
  - Summer (DST): UTC+2 (CEST)

Jalšje is a village in Croatia.
