= Tuheljske Toplice =

Coordinates: 46°03′58″N 15°47′06″E

Tuheljske Toplice Smrdeće Toplice
- Village
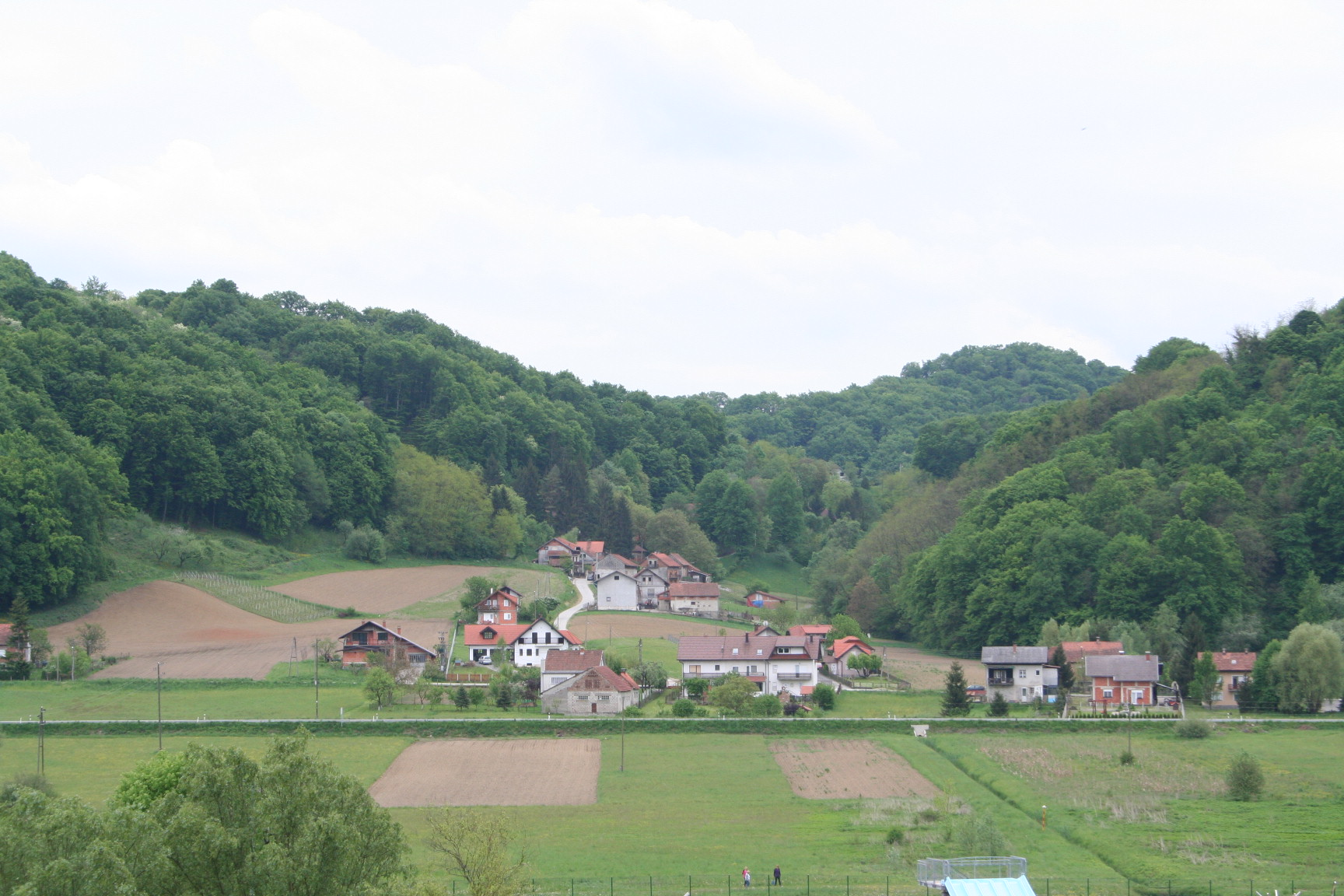
- Interactive map of Tuheljske Toplice
- Country: Croatia
- County: Krapina-Zagorje County
- Municipality: Tuhelj

Area
  - Total: 1.6 km^{2} (0.62 sq mi)

Population (2021)
  - Total: 338
  - Density: 210/km^{2} (550/sq mi)
- Time zone: UTC+1 (CET)
  - Summer (DST): UTC+2 (CEST)

Tuheljske Toplice is a village in Croatia.

== Bibliography ==
- Matoničkin, Ivo (1957). "Ekološka istraživanja faune termalnih voda Hrvatskog Zagorja" [Ecological Investigations of the Fauna of the Hot Springs of Hrvatsko Zagorje]. Rad Jugoslavenske akademije znanosti i umjetnosti. Odjel za prirodne nauke (in Serbo-Croatian). 733: 139–205. ISSN 1330-5697.
- Vouk, Vale (1916). "Biološka istraživanja termalnih voda Hrvatskoga zagorja" [Biological Explorations of the Hot Springs of Hrvatsko Zagorje]. Prirodoslovna istraživanja Hrvatske i Slavonije (in Serbo-Croatian). 8: 1–17. ISSN 1333-2325.
