= D206 road =

State road in northwestern Croatia

D206 state road

Route information
- Length: 28.7 km (17.8 mi)

Major junctions
- From: Hum na Sutli border crossing to Slovenia
- D207 in Hum na Sutli; D507 near Valentinovo
- To: D1 in Krapina

Location
- Country: Croatia
- Counties: Krapina-Zagorje
- Major cities: Krapina

Highway system
- Highways in Croatia

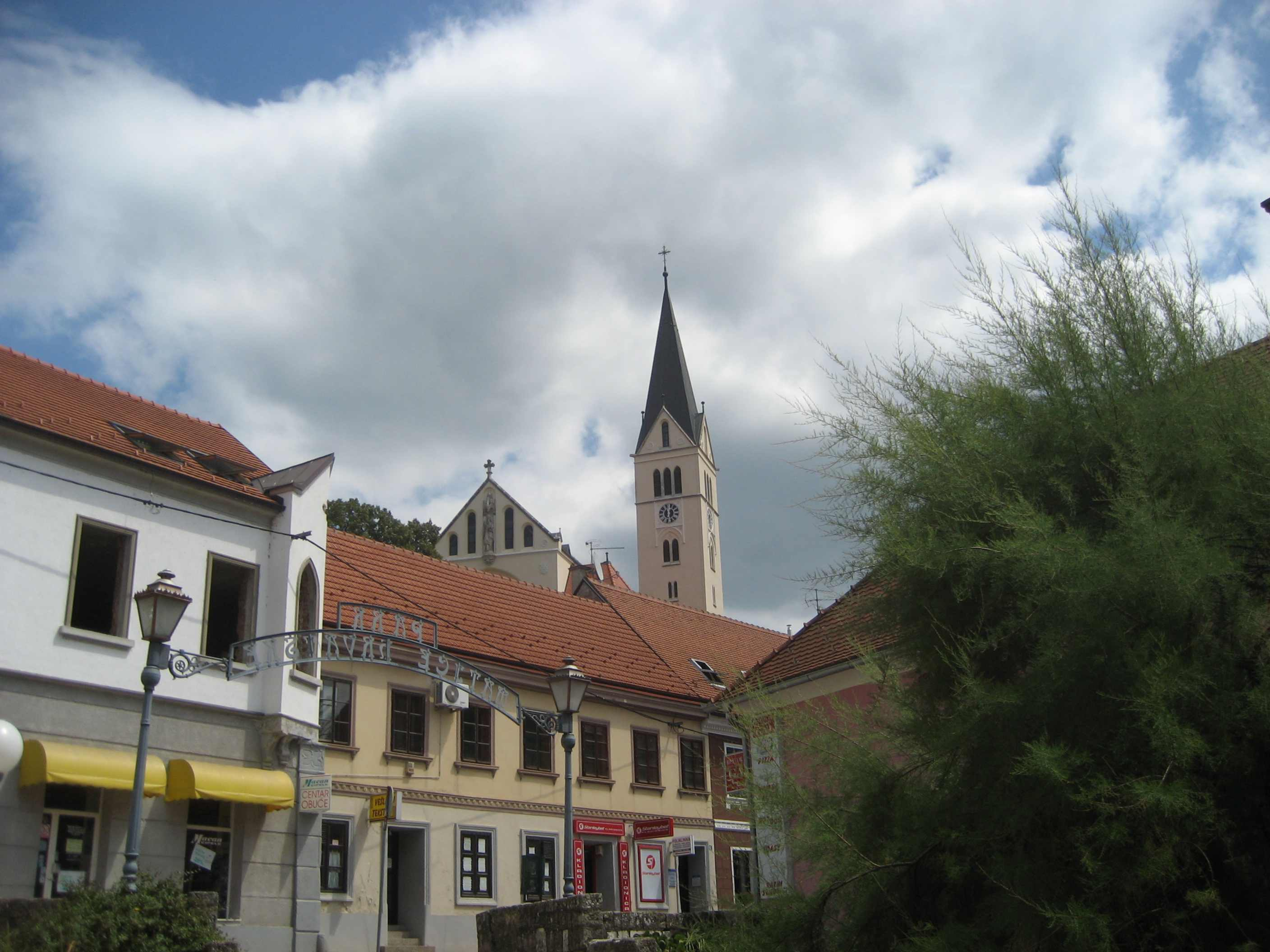
Krapina, at the eastern terminus of the D206 road

D206 is a state road in Hrvatsko Zagorje region of Croatia connecting Hum na Sutli border crossing to Slovenia to the city of Krapina and the A2 motorway Krapina interchange via D1 state road. The road is 28.7 km (17.8 mi) long.

The D206, like all state roads in Croatia, is managed and maintained by Hrvatske ceste, state owned company.

== Traffic volume ==
Traffic is regularly counted and reported by Hrvatske ceste, operator of the road.

D206 traffic volume
Road	Counting site	AADT	ASDT	Notes
D206	1112 Hum na Sutli	2,908	2,908	Adjacent to the Ž2092 junction.
D206	1105 Petrovsko	1,371	1,508	Adjacent to the Ž2121 junction.

== Road junctions and populated areas ==
D206 junctions/populated areas
Type	Slip roads/Notes
	Hum na Sutli border crossing to Slovenia. Slovenian route 107 to Rogatec, Slovenia. The western terminus of the road.
	Hum na Sutli; D207 to Đurmanec (D1).
	Lastine; Ž2092 to Mali Tabor and Vučja Gorica.
	Ž2095 to Klenovec Humski.
	Pregrada; Ž2096 to Donja Plemenšćina, Podbrezovica and Đurmanec (D207). Ž2151 to Sopot and Desinić.
	Ž2118 to Gorjakovo.
	D507 to Gubaševo (D205).
	Valentinovo
	Slatina Svedruška; Ž2120 to Štuparje, Stara Ves Petrovska.
	Petrovsko
	Tkalci; Ž2121 to Gornja Pačetina.
	Krapina; D1 to Macelj border crossing and Đurmanec (to the north) and to the A2 motorway Krapina interchange and to Zabok (to the south). Ž2098 to Đurmanec (D207) and to Popovec (D1). The eastern terminus of the road.
