= Pregrada =

- Town
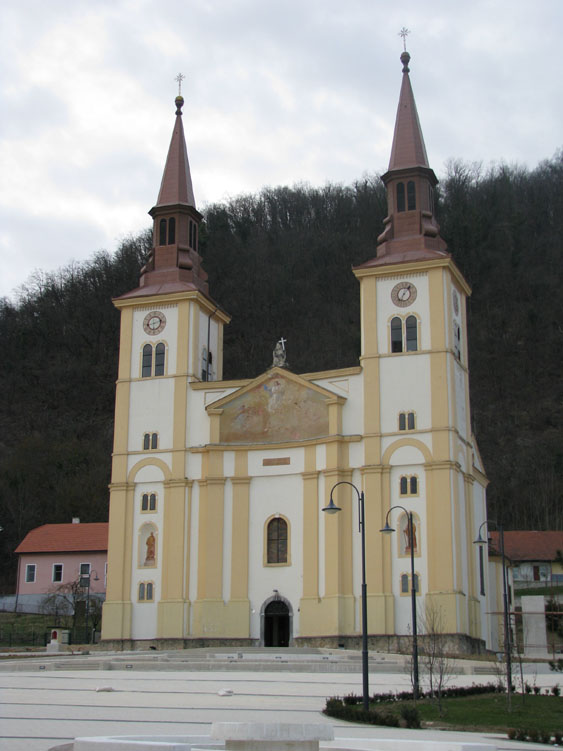
- Church of the Ascension of the Virgin Mary

- Location of Pregrada in Croatia Pregrada (Croatia)
- Coordinates: 46.16°N 15.75°E
- Country: Croatia
- Region: Central Croatia (Hrvatsko Zagorje)
- County: Krapina-Zagorje County

Government
  - Mayor: Goran Vukmanić (HDZ)

Area
  - Town: 67.5 km^{2} (26.1 sq mi)
  - Urban: 4.4 km^{2} (1.7 sq mi)

Population (2021)
  - Town: 5,927
  - Density: 87.8/km^{2} (227/sq mi)
  - Urban: 1,870
  - Urban density: 430/km^{2} (1,100/sq mi)
- Time zone: UTC+1 (Central European Time)
- Website: pregrada.hr

Pregrada is a town and municipality in Krapina-Zagorje County in Croatia.

== History ==
The name Pregrada is first mentioned on August 9, 1334, in the statutes of the Zagreb Kaptol. The parish is certainly much older because it was listed as the oldest one in the Archdiocese of Zagorje.

How the town got its name is still a matter of dispute. There are two hypotheses about the creation of the name. The first one was given by Gjuro Szabo, a Croatian historian, who interprets that the bed of the river Kosteljina, which passes through the town, was blocked by some kind of partition, and that's how the place got its name (pregrada = en. partition). The second version originates from Maristele Sabljić who says that the owner of Kostel, Prince George of Brandenburg (Juraj Branderbuški), stationed his defense companies "in front of the city" (cro. pred gradom), on the slopes of Kunagora, and thus the name Pregrada was born. Both versions have their basis, but there is no reliable evidence.

In the Middle Ages Pregrada belonged to the Kostel fief. The first written information about Kostel can be found in the Statutes of the Zagreb Kaptol. However, the history of Kostel fiefs can be traced back to the arrival of the Counts of Celje, who received the land of Kostel and other properties in Croatian Zagorje from King Sigismund in 1308. After the death of the last successor of the Celjski family in 1456, Kostel became the property of Ivan Vitovac. As his descendants sided with the German emperor Maximilian, then Croatian-Hungarian ruler Matthias Corvinus (Matija Korvin) confiscated all the properties in Zagorje and gave them to his son John Corvinus (Ivaniš Korvin). Kostel changes its owners again when John's widow Beatrice Frankopan marries Prince George of Brandenburg (Juraj Brandeburški) who was the owner of Kostel for a short time. Due to his extravagant lifestyle, the prince had to sell the manor in 1523., which was then bought by Petar Keglević, ban of Jajce, for 13,000 forints.

The ruins of the fortress of Kostelgrad still stand on a hill of Kunagora above the bend of the river Kosteljina, as a remnant of that period. Kostelgrad is a medieval fortress located north of Pregrada in a strategic position that enabled the control of roads from different sides. Within the outer wall that encircles the city stands out the western tower, which has a large opening for cannons. A story about the time when Petar Keglević, who achieved the greatest honor as a Croatian ban (1537–1542), acquired Kostelgrad says that he armed his subjects and with his guard became the fear and terror of the Styrian and German merchants who came to these parts. Sometimes the acquisition of his estates was at least controversial, so he incurred the wrath of the powerful, even the wrath of King Ferdinand, whom he had previously sided with. Despite all the ups and downs, the family kept its headquarters in Kostelgrad, where Petar died in 1554 and was buried in the parish church in Pregrada. Today's tradition of shooting from a flintlock is connected with Petar and his armed guard. In honor of the Resurrection of Jesus, Petar Keglević sent a sentry to safeguard the tomb of Jesus Christ on the night of Holy Saturday to Easter, and in the morning of Easter after leaving the Church, the Resurrection was celebrated with gunshots. Christ's resurrection falls at the time of the reavival of all nature, when apparent deadness ends and a new life begins, and the people of Pregrada joyfully greet the signs of new life by firing a flintlock.

As the way of life changes, inaccessible towns and burgs are abandoned, and new castles are built in the lowlands. Therefore, at the end of the 17th century, the Keglević family left the Kostel fortress and moved to the Pregrada valley, where they built a castle and stayed there until the end of the 19th century.

At the end of the 19th century in Pregrada, Adolf Alfons Thierry founded the first chemical and pharmaceutical company in Southeast Europe. With the abolition of districts in 1955, the municipality of Pregrada was founded, which existed until 1962, when it was merged with the municipality of Krapina. This unity lasted until 1978, when the Parliament of the Socialist Republic of Croatia re-established the municipality of Pregrada. With the Law on the Areas of Counties, Cities and Municipalities, passed by the Croatian Parliament in January 1997, Pregrada was granted the status of a town.

== Climate ==
Since records began in 1992, the highest temperature recorded at the local weather station was 38.5 °C (101.3 °F), on 13 August 2003. The coldest temperature was −23.5 °C (−10.3 °F), on 10 February 2005.

== Demographics ==
In the 2021 census, there were 5,927 inhabitants in the following settlements:

- Benkovo, population 303
- Bregi Kostelski, population 224
- Bušin, population 127
- Cigrovec, population 360
- Donja Plemenšćina, population 133
- Gabrovec, population 44
- Gorjakovo, population 296
- Gornja Plemenšćina, population 217
- Klenice, population 74
- Kostel, population 119
- Kostelsko, population 211
- Mala Gora, population 137
- Marinec, population 100
- Martiša Ves, population 11
- Pavlovec Pregradski, population 209
- Pregrada, population 1,870
- Sopot, population 294
- Stipernica, population 127
- Svetojurski Vrh, population 144
- Valentinovo, population 151
- Velika Gora, population 65
- Vinagora, population 32
- Višnjevec, population 142
- Vojsak, population 107
- Vrhi Pregradski, population 336
- Vrhi Vinagorski, population 94

In the 2021 census, the absolute majority were Croats at 98.87%.

Town of Pregrada: Population trends 1857–2021
v

population	7826	8782	9636	10282	10733	11768	10933	11417	11878	11289	10077	8900	8047	7391	7165	6594	5927
	1857	1869	1880	1890	1900	1910	1921	1931	1948	1953	1961	1971	1981	1991	2001	2011	2021

Sources: Croatian Bureau of Statistics publications

== Administration ==
The current mayor of Pregrada is Goran Vukmanić (HDZ) and the Pregrada Town Council consists of 13 seats.

Groups	Councilors per group
SDP-DHSS-HSS	7 / 13
HDZ-HSU	6 / 13

== Notable people ==
- Janko Leskovar, Croatian novelist

== Twin towns - twin cities ==
- Jánoshida – Hungary
