= R106 railway (Croatia) =

Railway line in Croatia

Overview
- Status: Active
- Owner: HŽ Infrastruktura d.o.o.
- Line number: R106 (HŽ)
- Locale: Krapina-Zagorje County
- Stations: 11

Service
- Type: Regional rail
- Operator(s): Croatian Railways

History
- Opened: 1886 (Zabok - Krapina); 1930 (Krapina - state border with Slovenia)

Technical
- Line length: 27.19 km (16.8 mi)
- Number of tracks: 1
- Track gauge: 1,435 mm (4 ft 8 1/2 in) standard gauge
- Electrification: Non-electrified
- Operating speed: Up to 80 km/h (49.7 mph)

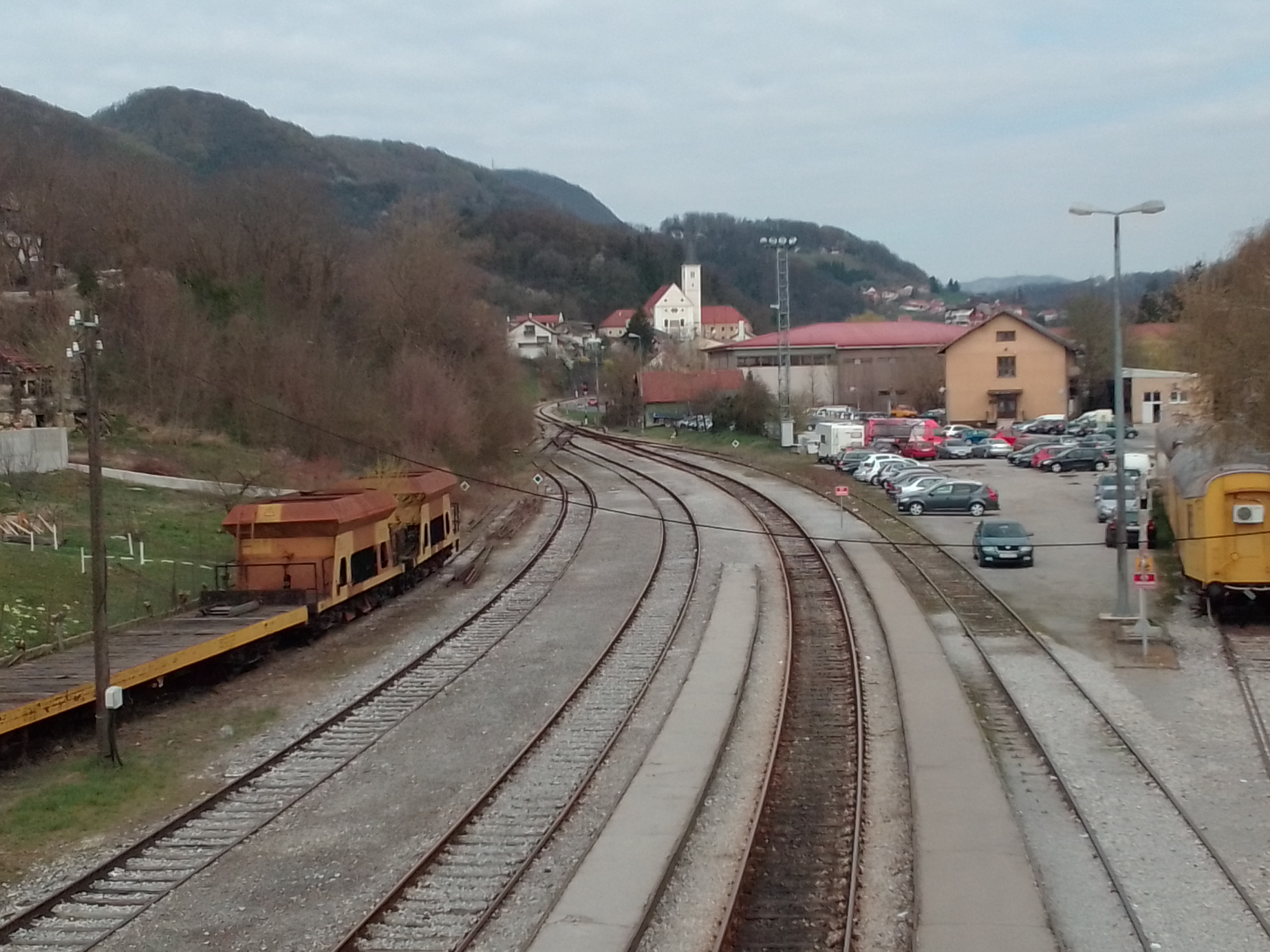
View of the railway station in Krapina from the passenger overpass (April 2022)

The Zabok – Krapina – Đurmanec – state border with Slovenia railway, officially designated as the R106 railway, is a 27.19 km (16.8 mi) long railway line in north-west Croatia which originates out of the regional corridor R201 in Zabok and connects with Slovenian railway network near Rogatec.

== Background ==
It is non-electrified single-track railway used for both freight and passenger (regional/commuter) traffic. Passenger connections with the trains running on R201 and L202 corridors can be made at Zabok station. Part of the track between Zabok and Krapina was originally opened in 1886 and the part between Krapina and Rogatec in 1930.

During the time of Yugoslav Railways, passenger trains on this route were running between Zabok (or Zagreb) and either Krapina, Đurmanec, Rogatec (present-day Slovenia) or Celje (present-day Slovenia). After the breakup of Yugoslavia (1991), Croatian Railways have been running passenger trains between Zabok (or Zagreb) and Krapina/Đurmanec or Hromec (since 2014).

The Đurmanec – Rogatec part of the track was out of service between 1991 and 2014, when it was revitalized/reconstructed following the re-introduction of passenger transport between Rogatec and Đurmanec (where the trains connect to the ones running between Đurmanec and Zabok), provided by Slovenian Railways.

Between Zabok and Đurmanec (or Hromec, since 2014), diesel multiple units started to cover passenger services exclusively since mid-1990's (mostly HŽ series 7121), until when the passenger trains on this route consisted of two-axle cars powered by steam and later diesel locomotive.

Minority of direct passenger trains between Zagreb and Krapina/Đurmanec/Hromec were finally discounted in 2021, following the reconstruction and electrification of the R201 corridor between Zabok and Zaprešić.

Stations on the route out of Zabok towards state border with Slovenia include Štrucljevo (halt), Sveti Križ Začretje (station), Dukovec (halt), Velika Ves (halt), Pristava Krapinska (halt, opened in 2014), Krapina (station), Doliće (halt), Žutnica (halt), Đurmanec (station) and Hromec (halt), respectively.

== Reconstruction of the Zabok – Krapina section (2023–2024) ==
Between 2023 and 2024, part of the track between Zabok and Krapina went under major reconstruction, which resulted in renovation of entire upper rail structure along the route, rehabilitation of all railway crossings and creating parameters for raising the maximum speed of train traffic.
