= Vidovec =

Vidovec may refer to:

- Vidovec, Varaždin County, a village and municipality west of Varaždin, Croatia
- Vidovec Krapinski, a village near Krapina, Croatia
- Vidovec Petrovski, a village near Krapina, Croatia
- Vidovec, Zagreb, a settlement in the Podsljeme district north of Zagreb, Croatia, previously known as Vidovec Čučerski
- Donji Vidovec, a village and municipality east of Čakovec, Croatia
- Gornji Vidovec, a former village near Ivanovec, Croatia

== See also ==
- Vidovac, a village in Serbia
- Vidovac Cesarički, a village near Karlobag, Croatia
