= Straža Krapinska =

- Village
- Location within Croatia
- Coordinates: 46°9′29″N 15°53′28″E
- Country: Croatia
- Region: Hrvatsko Zagorje
- County: Krapina-Zagorje County
- Municipality: Krapina

Area
  - Total: 0.4 km^{2} (0.15 sq mi)

Population (2021)
  - Total: 44
  - Density: 110/km^{2} (280/sq mi)
- Time zone: UTC+1 (CET)
  - Summer (DST): UTC+2 (CEST)

Straža Krapinska is a village near Krapina, in Krapina-Zagorje County, Croatia.
