= Pretkovec =

- Village
- Location within Croatia
- Coordinates: 46°8′35″N 15°50′49″E
- Country: Croatia
- Region: Hrvatsko Zagorje
- County: Krapina-Zagorje County
- Municipality: Krapina

Area
  - Total: 1.0 km^{2} (0.39 sq mi)

Population (2021)
  - Total: 52
  - Density: 52/km^{2} (130/sq mi)
- Time zone: UTC+1 (CET)
  - Summer (DST): UTC+2 (CEST)

Pretkovec is a village near Krapina, in Krapina-Zagorje County, Croatia.
