= Doliće =

Doliće may refer to:

- Doliće, Serbia, a village near Sjenica, Serbia
- Doliće, Croatia, a village near Krapina, Croatia
