= Zagora, Krapina-Zagorje County =

Zagora
- Village
- Location within Croatia
- Coordinates: 46°11′31″N 15°52′17″E
- Country: Croatia
- Region: Hrvatsko Zagorje
- County: Krapina-Zagorje County
- Municipality: Krapina

Area
  - Total: 2.0 km^{2} (0.77 sq mi)

Population (2021)
  - Total: 88
  - Density: 44/km^{2} (110/sq mi)
- Time zone: UTC+1 (CET)
  - Summer (DST): UTC+2 (CEST)

Zagora is a village in the municipality of Krapina, in Krapina-Zagorje County, Croatia.
