= Petrovsko =

- Interactive map of Petrovsko
- Location within Croatia
- Coordinates: 46°9′36″N 15°50′24″E
- Country: Croatia
- County: Krapina-Zagorje County

Government
  - Mayor: Valentina Presečki (Independent)

Area
  - Total: 18.9 km^{2} (7.3 sq mi)

Population (2021)
  - Total: 2,270
  - Density: 120/km^{2} (311/sq mi)
- Time zone: UTC+1 (CET)
  - Summer (DST): UTC+2 (CEST)
- Website: petrovsko.hr

Petrovsko is a village and municipality in the Krapina-Zagorje County, northern Croatia.

== History ==
Petrovsko was called Konoba for centuries and was first mentioned in 1334. In Petrovsko, a parish church was built in honor of Saint Peter and in 1661 a parish palace was mentioned alongside the church. The chapel of Saint Benedict, built between 1749 and 1758, is located close to the parish church, on the hill above the local cemetery. The beginning of education in the town dates back to April 15, 1867, when the foundation stone of the first classroom was laid. The then parish priest Markovac, as well as local councilors and other dignitaries contributed to the beginning of education in Petrovsko.

Towards the end of the 19th century, the municipality of Konoba was founded with its seat in Krapina. It succeeded in 1904, and the first mayor of the newly formed municipality was Mijo Hršak. In 1943, the municipal building burned down in a fire, and the municipality was formally abolished in 1956. The municipality of Petrovsko was re-established on 20 April 1993 in the independent Republic of Croatia as part of the Krapina-Zagorje County.

== Demographics ==
In the 2021 census, there were a total of 2,270 inhabitants in the area, in the following settlements:

- Benkovec Petrovski, population 116
- Brezovica Petrovska, population 88
- Gredenec, population 76
- Mala Pačetina, population 79
- Petrovsko, population 197
- Podgaj Petrovski, population 223
- Preseka Petrovska, population 261
- Rovno, population 95
- Slatina Svedruška, population 315
- Stara Ves Petrovska, population 148
- Svedruža, population 310
- Štuparje, population 362

In the same census, Croats were the majority of the population at 99.56%.

Petrovsko: Population trends 1857–2021
v

population	2380	2687	2986	3386	3686	3951	3726	3883	4059	4004	3712	3654	3356	3181	3022	2656	2270
	1857	1869	1880	1890	1900	1910	1921	1931	1948	1953	1961	1971	1981	1991	2001	2011	2021

Sources: Croatian Bureau of Statistics publications

== Administration ==
The current mayor of Petrovsko is Valentina Presečki and the Petrovsko Municipal Council consists of 10 seats.

Groups	Councilors per group
HDZ-DP	3 / 10
Independents	3 / 10
SDP	3 / 10
Mladen Šerek	1 / 10
