= Kostel, Croatia =

Kostel
- Village
- Location within Krapina-Zagorje County Location within Croatia
- Coordinates: 46.183987°N 15.725673°E
- Country: Croatia
- County: Krapina-Zagorje County
- Municipality: Pregrada

Area
  - Total: 3.7 km^{2} (1.4 sq mi)

Population (2021)
  - Total: 119
  - Density: 32/km^{2} (83/sq mi)

Kostel is a village in northern Croatia. It is located just south of the D206 connecting Pregrada to Hum na Sutli. Two nearby villages, Kostelsko and Bregi Kostelski have the same name root.

== Climate ==
Between 1981 and 1987, the highest temperature recorded at the local weather station was 35.2 °C (95.4 °F), on 28 July 1983. The coldest temperature was −23.4 °C (−10.1 °F), on 13 February 1985.
