= Škarićevo =

- Village
- Location within Croatia
- Coordinates: 46°7′33″N 15°50′59″E
- Country: Croatia
- Region: Hrvatsko Zagorje
- County: Krapina-Zagorje County
- Municipality: Krapina

Area
  - Total: 7.7 km^{2} (3.0 sq mi)

Population (2021)
  - Total: 593
  - Density: 77/km^{2} (200/sq mi)
- Time zone: UTC+1 (CET)
  - Summer (DST): UTC+2 (CEST)

Škarićevo is a village near Krapina, in Krapina-Zagorje County, Croatia.

== History ==
On 26 March 2022 at 13:00 the DVD Škarićevo received a call about a wildfire in the area. 10 hectares (25 acres) burned by the time it was put out at 14:10.
