= Vučja Gorica =

Castle in Croatia

Vučja Gorica (or Gorica) is a castle in northern Croatia, located near Mali Tabor and Hum na Sutli in Krapina-Zagorje County.
