= Polje Krapinsko =

- Village
- Location within Croatia
- Coordinates: 46°8′26″N 15°52′53″E
- Country: Croatia
- Region: Hrvatsko Zagorje
- County: Krapina-Zagorje County
- Municipality: Krapina

Area
  - Total: 1.7 km^{2} (0.66 sq mi)

Population (2021)
  - Total: 613
  - Density: 360/km^{2} (930/sq mi)
- Time zone: UTC+1 (CET)
  - Summer (DST): UTC+2 (CEST)

Polje Krapinsko is a village near Krapina, in Krapina-Zagorje County, Croatia. Area of Polje Krapinsko, Krapina is 0.332km^{2}. Population is only 118. Male population is 57(48.4%) and Female population is 61(51.6%). Population change from 1975 to 2015 is +1.7. Timezone is Central European Summer Time.
