= Strahinje =

- Village
- Location within Croatia
- Coordinates: 46°10′36″N 15°52′10″E
- Country: Croatia
- Region: Hrvatsko Zagorje
- County: Krapina-Zagorje County
- Municipality: Krapina

Area
  - Total: 1.7 km^{2} (0.66 sq mi)

Population (2021)
  - Total: 286
  - Density: 170/km^{2} (440/sq mi)
- Time zone: UTC+1 (CET)
  - Summer (DST): UTC+2 (CEST)

Strahinje is a village near Krapina, in Krapina-Zagorje County, Croatia.
