= Šušelj Brijeg =

- Village
- Location within Croatia
- Coordinates: 46°10′16″N 15°52′59″E
- Country: Croatia
- Region: Hrvatsko Zagorje
- County: Krapina-Zagorje County
- Municipality: Krapina

Area
  - Total: 0.6 km^{2} (0.23 sq mi)

Population (2021)
  - Total: 0
  - Density: 0.0/km^{2} (0.0/sq mi)
- Time zone: UTC+1 (CET)
  - Summer (DST): UTC+2 (CEST)

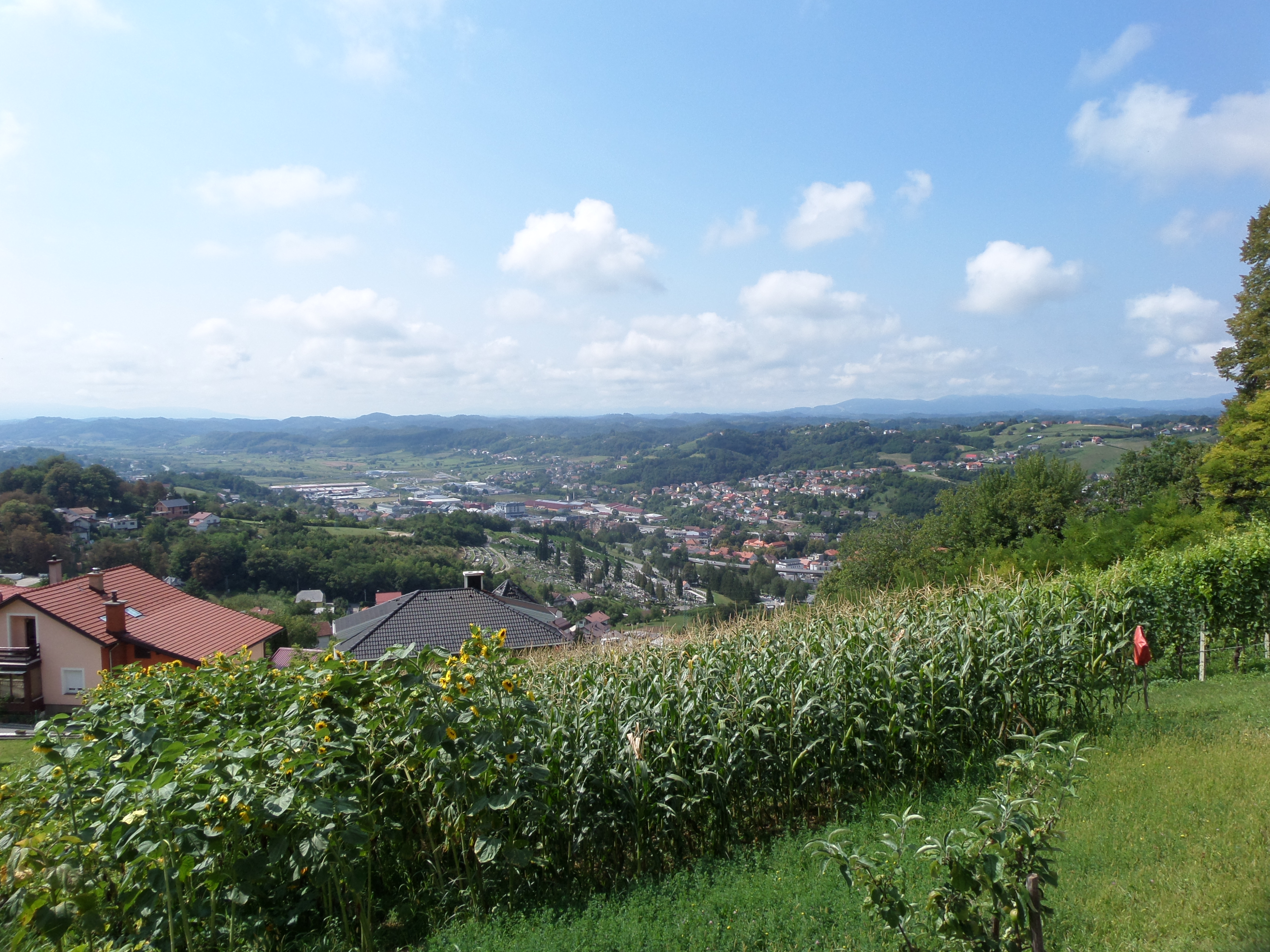
Šušelj Brijeg in 2016

Šušelj Brijeg is a village near Krapina, in Krapina-Zagorje County, Croatia.
