= Trški Vrh =

Coordinates: 46°09′47″N 15°52′52″E

- Village
- Interactive map of Trški Vrh
- Country: Croatia
- Region: Hrvatsko Zagorje
- County: Krapina-Zagorje County
- Municipality: Krapina

Area
  - Total: 1.2 km^{2} (0.46 sq mi)

Population (2021)
  - Total: 400
  - Density: 330/km^{2} (860/sq mi)
- Time zone: UTC+1 (CET)
  - Summer (DST): UTC+2 (CEST)

Trški Vrh is a village near Krapina, in Krapina-Zagorje County, Croatia.

In the 2011 census, population of the village was 399 inhabitants.

Of note is one of Croatia's finest baroque churches dated to 1761 and dedicated to the Blessed Virgin Mary of Jerusalem.
