= Kostelić =

Kostelić is a surname and it may refer to:

- Ante Kostelić (b. 1938), Croatian handballer and handball and alpine skiing coach
- Ivica Kostelić (b. 1979), Croatian alpine skier
- Janica Kostelić (b. 1982), Croatian alpine skier

== See also ==
- Kostel
