= Slatina Svedruška =

Coordinates: 46°09′25″N 15°48′54″E

- Village
- Interactive map of Slatina Svedruška
- Country: Croatia
- County: Krapina-Zagorje County
- Municipality: Petrovsko

Area
  - Total: 2.1 km^{2} (0.81 sq mi)

Population (2021)
  - Total: 315
  - Density: 150/km^{2} (390/sq mi)
- Time zone: UTC+1 (CET)
  - Summer (DST): UTC+2 (CEST)

Slatina Svedruška is a village in Croatia. It is connected by the D206 highway.
