= Žutnica =

- Village
- Location within Croatia
- Coordinates: 46°11′46″N 15°52′42″E
- Country: Croatia
- Region: Hrvatsko Zagorje
- County: Krapina-Zagorje County
- Municipality: Krapina

Area
  - Total: 2.6 km^{2} (1.0 sq mi)

Population (2021)
  - Total: 221
  - Density: 85/km^{2} (220/sq mi)
- Time zone: UTC+1 (CET)
  - Summer (DST): UTC+2 (CEST)

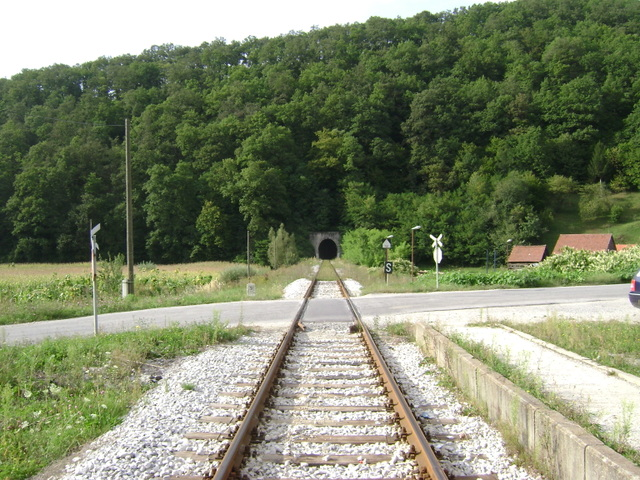
Žutnica train stop

Žutnica is a village in the municipality of Krapina, in Krapina-Zagorje County, Croatia.
