= Rovno (disambiguation) =

Rovno is the old name of the city of Rivne, Ukraine.

Rovno may also refer to:

- Rovno stage of Ediacaran, a geological period
- Rovno amber, a type of amber found in the Rivne area
- Rovno, Croatia, a village near Petrovsko
