= Gabrovec =

Gabrovec may refer to:

- Gabrovec, Italy, a village near Trieste
- Gabrovec, Croatia, a village near Krapina
- Gabrovec pri Kostrivnici, a village near Rogaška Slatina, Slovenia
- Gabrovec pri Dramljah, a village near Vojnik, Slovenia
