= Rikard Jorgovanić =

Croatian writer

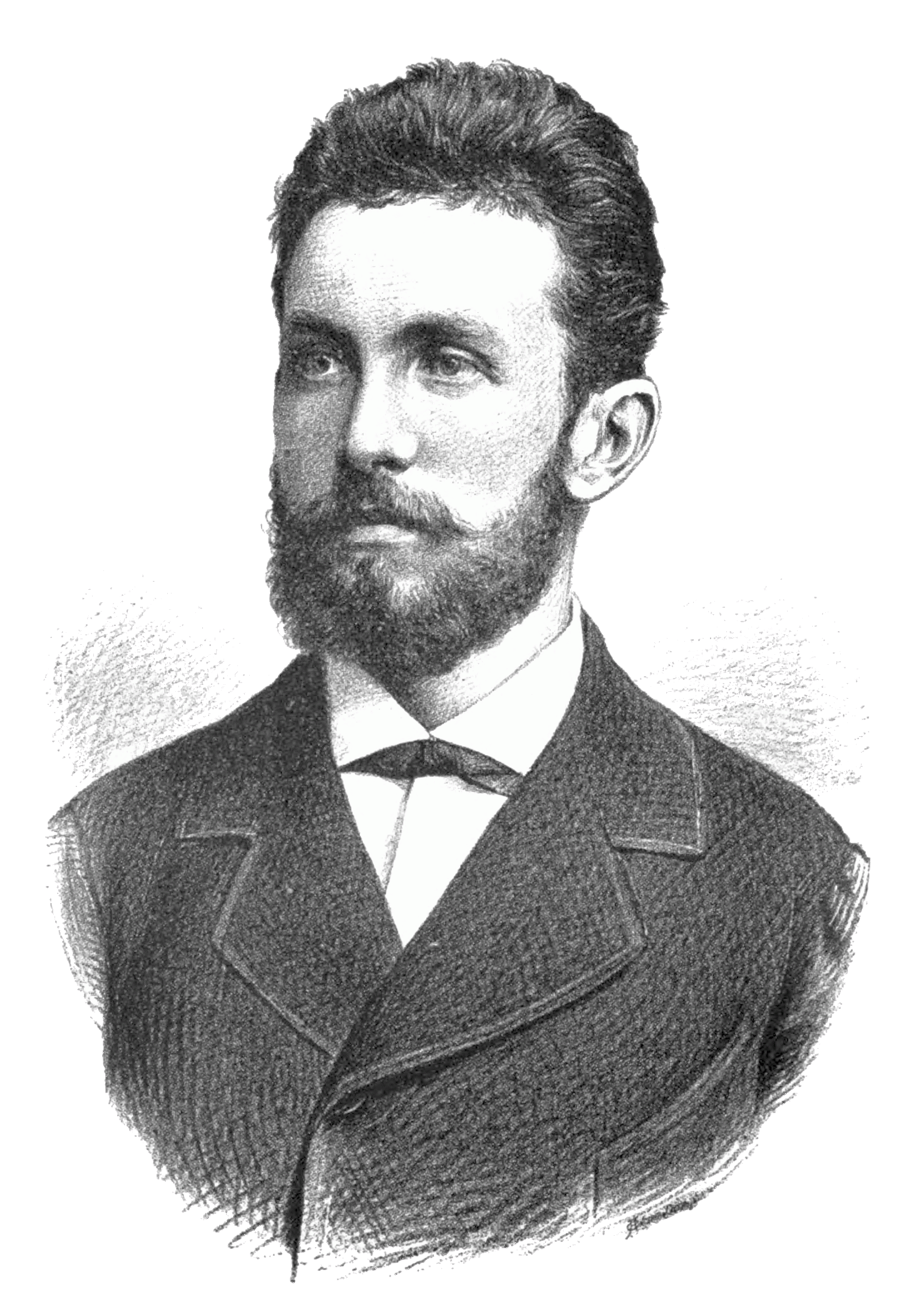
- Jorgovanić in an 1880 issue of Vienac
- Born: Rikard Flieder; 11 April 1853; Mali Tabor, Kingdom of Croatia, Austrian Empire (now Mali Tabor, Croatia)
- Died: 24 October 1880 (aged 27); Zagreb, Kingdom of Croatia-Slavonia, Austria-Hungary (now Zagreb, Croatia)
- Occupation(s): novelist, poet, editor

Rikard Jorgovanić (born Rikard Flieder, 11 April 1853 – 24 October 1880) was a Croatian writer, editor, and poet. The son of a Bohemian-born parent of German ethnicity, his Croatianized last name was calqued after German Flieder. He enrolled in the public school of Varaždin, and later continued his education in Zagreb. His poetical verses are characterized by intrigue and intimacy. While he is known as the first writer of fantasy in Croatia, his work also differs from the usual nationalistic ideology of the time.

== Work ==
List of works done during his life as a writer:

- On the Threshold (Croatian: Na pragu)
- Holy Winged One (Croatian: Svetokrilac)
- Night (Croatian: Noć)
- In Silent Sleeping Night (Croatian: U tihoj drijemajućoj noći)
- Children of the Mill (Croatian: Mlinarska djeca)
- Dada (Croatian: Dada)
- Love on the Catafalque (Croatian: Ljubav na odru)
- A Wife and A Lover (Croatian: Žena i ljubovca)
