= Vidovec Krapinski =

- Village
- Location within Croatia
- Coordinates: 46°8′13″N 15°51′33″E
- Country: Croatia
- Region: Hrvatsko Zagorje
- County: Krapina-Zagorje County
- Municipality: Krapina

Area
  - Total: 1.7 km^{2} (0.66 sq mi)

Population (2021)
  - Total: 183
  - Density: 110/km^{2} (280/sq mi)
- Time zone: UTC+1 (CET)
  - Summer (DST): UTC+2 (CEST)

Vidovec Krapinski is a village in the municipality of Krapina, in Krapina-Zagorje County, Croatia.
