= Doliće, Croatia =

Doliće
- Village
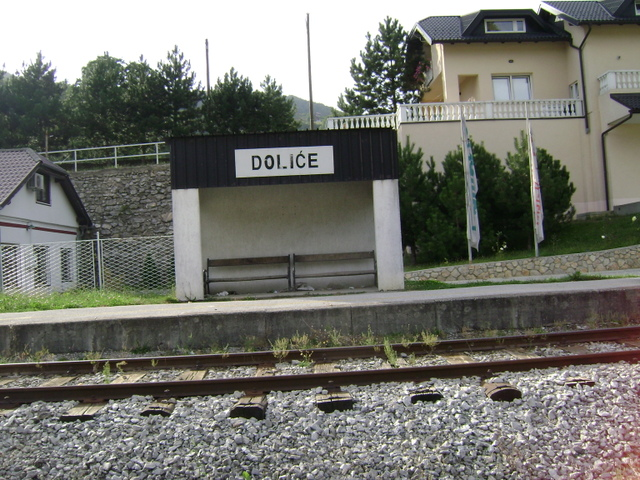
- Doliće railway station

- Location within Croatia
- Coordinates: 46°10′24″N 15°51′42″E
- Country: Croatia
- Region: Hrvatsko Zagorje
- County: Krapina-Zagorje County
- Municipality: Krapina

Area
  - Total: 2.4 km^{2} (0.93 sq mi)

Population (2021)
  - Total: 413
  - Density: 170/km^{2} (450/sq mi)
- Time zone: UTC+1 (CET)
  - Summer (DST): UTC+2 (CEST)

Doliće is a village near Krapina, in Krapina-Zagorje County, Croatia.
