= Rovno, Croatia =

Settlement in Krapina-Zagorje County, Croatia

Rovno
- Settlement
- Interactive map of Rovno
- Location of Rovno in Croatia
- Coordinates: 46°09′47″N 15°50′46″E
- Country: Croatia
- County: Krapina-Zagorje
- Municipality: Petrovsko

Area
  - Total: 0.8 km^{2} (0.31 sq mi)

Population (2021)
  - Total: 95
  - Density: 120/km^{2} (310/sq mi)
- Time zone: UTC+1 (CET)
  - Summer (DST): UTC+2 (CEST)
- Postal code: 49000 Krapina
- Area code: +385 (0)49

Rovno is a settlement in the Municipality of Petrovsko in Croatia. In 2021, its population was 95.

== Demographics ==
Rovno: Population trends 1857–2021
v

population	154	147	173	225	220	216	244	247	236	228	234	227	190	154	139	120	95
	1857	1869	1880	1890	1900	1910	1921	1931	1948	1953	1961	1971	1981	1991	2001	2011	2021

Sources: Croatian Bureau of Statistics publications
