= Gabrovec, Croatia =

Settlement in Krapina-Zagorje County, Croatia

Gabrovec
- Settlement
- Interactive map of Gabrovec
- Location of Gabrovec in Croatia
- Coordinates: 46°09′54″N 15°42′36″E
- Country: Croatia
- County: Krapina-Zagorje
- City: Pregrada

Area
  - Total: 1.3 km^{2} (0.50 sq mi)

Population (2021)
  - Total: 44
  - Density: 34/km^{2} (88/sq mi)
- Time zone: UTC+1 (CET)
  - Summer (DST): UTC+2 (CEST)
- Postal code: 49218 Pregrada
- Area code: +385 (0)49

Gabrovec is a settlement in the City of Pregrada in Croatia. In 2021, its population was 44.

== Demographics ==
Gabrovec: Population trends 1857–2021
v

population	182	175	182	217	225	258	229	234	303	185	176	148	117	91	74	59	44
	1857	1869	1880	1890	1900	1910	1921	1931	1948	1953	1961	1971	1981	1991	2001	2011	2021

Sources: Croatian Bureau of Statistics publications
