= Janko Leskovar =

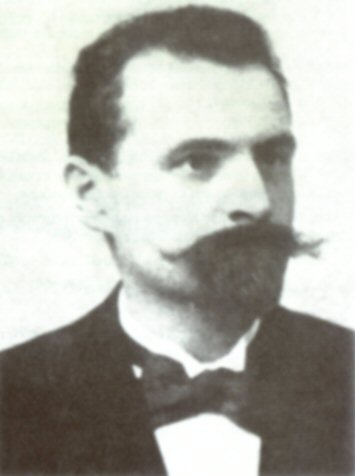
- Born: 12 December 1861; Valentinovo
- Died: 4 February 1949; Valentinovo
- Occupation: Teacher
- Years active: 1891–1905
- Spouse: Terezija Leskovar
- Parent: Ivan Leskovar

Janko Leskovar (12 December 1861 – 4 February 1949) was a Croatian novelist. His literary form was marked with the novella Misao na vječnost.

== Biography ==
Leskovar was born in Valentinovo to a noble family. His grandfather was a blacksmith. His father was named Ivan Leskovar, while his wife was Terezija Leskovar.

Leskovar worked as a teacher. He finished the novel Misao na vječnost as a middle-aged writer. The novel was published in 1891 in the magazine Vijenac.

In his decade of writing influence, Leskovar was preoccupied with various psychological analyses of his story characters.

His birth house remains preserved in Valentinovo.

== Works ==
- Endless contemplation
- Fallen castles
- Shadows of love
- Catastrophe
- After the accident
- The lost son
- Jesenski cvijeci
