= Tkalci =

Coordinates: 46°09′32″N 15°51′32″E

- Village
- Interactive map of Tkalci
- Country: Croatia
- County: Krapina-Zagorje County

Area
  - Total: 1.9 km^{2} (0.73 sq mi)

Population (2021)
  - Total: 402
  - Density: 210/km^{2} (550/sq mi)
- Time zone: UTC+1 (CET)
  - Summer (DST): UTC+2 (CEST)

Tkalci is a village in Croatia. It is connected by the D206 highway.
