= Jesenje =

- Location within Croatia
- Coordinates: 46°12′0″N 15°53′24″E
- Country: Croatia
- County: Krapina-Zagorje County

Government
  - Mayor: Dario Cvrtila (HDZ)

Area
  - Total: 24.5 km^{2} (9.5 sq mi)

Population (2021)
  - Total: 1,371
  - Density: 56.0/km^{2} (145/sq mi)
- Time zone: UTC+1 (CET)
  - Summer (DST): UTC+2 (CEST)
- Website: jesenje.hr

Jesenje is a municipality in the Krapina-Zagorje County in Croatia.

== History ==
From the first mention of the parish of Jesenje in 1328, it belonged to the parish of Radoboj until 1785.

The Church of St. John the Baptist in Gornje Jesenje began to be built in 1847 on the site of an old chapel built in the mid-17th century. The church was blessed and opened in 1858. There were major financial problems in the construction of the church, so Emperor Franz Joseph himself, at the intervention of the parish priest, urged and sent a considerable sum of money sufficient for the construction of the church. The 4 bells on the church tower were removed during World War I and used for military purposes. The church was renovated on the inside in 1990 and on the outside in 2004.

The development of education in Gornje Jesenje began in 1857, and according to the data, 131 students were enrolled in the school that year. Classes were held in private buildings, and the first was in the private building of the Jedvaj family in Gornje Jesenje. The foundation stone for the first school building in Gornje Jesenje was laid in 1904, and in the same year the school got one classroom and an apartment for the teacher. In 1957 the school was organized as an eight-grade school, and classes took place in the premises of the school and the community dormitory. In 1973 due to the large number of children, the addition of a new, larger part of the school was started, which was completed in 1976.

== Demographics ==
In the 2021 census, there were a total of 1,371 inhabitants. The absolute majority of the population are Croats at 99.56%. The population is distributed in the following settlements:

- Brdo Jesenjsko, population 138
- Cerje Jesenjsko, population 148
- Donje Jesenje, population 325
- Gornje Jesenje, population 669
- Lužani Zagorski, population 91
Jesenje: Population trends 1857–2021
v

population	1807	1923	2143	2352	2457	2713	2673	2747	2682	2704	2594	2349	2073	1839	1643	1560	1371
	1857	1869	1880	1890	1900	1910	1921	1931	1948	1953	1961	1971	1981	1991	2001	2011	2021

Sources: Croatian Bureau of Statistics publications

== Administration ==
The current mayor of Jesenje is Dario Cvrtila (HDZ) and the Jesenje Municipal Council consists of 9 seats.

Groups	Councilors per group
HDZ	7 / 9
Independents	2 / 9
