= Valentinovo =

Coordinates: 46°08′56″N 15°47′35″E

- Village
- Interactive map of Valentinovo
- Country: Croatia
- County: Krapina-Zagorje County
- Municipality: Pregrada

Area
  - Total: 0.77 sq mi (2.0 km^{2})

Population (2021)
  - Total: 151
  - Density: 200/sq mi (76/km^{2})
- Time zone: UTC+1 (CET)
  - Summer (DST): UTC+2 (CEST)

Valentinovo is a village in Croatia. It is connected by the D206 highway.
