= Lastine =

Coordinates: 46°12′40″N 15°40′59″E

- Village
- Interactive map of Lastine
- Country: Croatia
- County: Krapina-Zagorje County

Area
  - Total: 0.8 km^{2} (0.31 sq mi)

Population (2021)
  - Total: 164
  - Density: 200/km^{2} (530/sq mi)
- Time zone: UTC+1 (CET)
  - Summer (DST): UTC+2 (CEST)

Lastine is a village in Croatia. It is connected by the D206 highway.
