= Kostel =

Kostel may refer to:

- Kostel, Kostel, a settlement in the Municipality of Kostel, Slovenia
- Municipality of Kostel, Slovenia
- Kostel, Croatia, a village near Pregrada, Croatia
- Kostel, German name of the Czech town of Podivín
- Kostel Pribićki, a village near Krašić, Croatia
- Kostel, Bulgaria, a village in Elena Municipality
- Pietrapelosa
