= Sopot, Krapina-Zagorje County =

Sopot
- Village
- Location within Croatia
- Coordinates: 46°09′18″N 15°43′52″E
- Country: Croatia
- County: Krapina-Zagorje County

Area
  - Total: 3.1 km^{2} (1.2 sq mi)

Population (2021)
  - Total: 294
  - Density: 95/km^{2} (250/sq mi)
- Time zone: UTC+1 (CET)
  - Summer (DST): UTC+2 (CEST)

Sopot is a village in Krapina-Zagorje County, Croatia.
