= Gorjakovo =

Coordinates: 46°07′N 15°46′E

- Village
- Interactive map of Gorjakovo
- Country: Croatia
- County: Krapina-Zagorje County

Area
  - Total: 5.1 km^{2} (2.0 sq mi)

Population (2021)
  - Total: 296
  - Density: 58/km^{2} (150/sq mi)
- Time zone: UTC+1 (CET)
  - Summer (DST): UTC+2 (CEST)

Gorjakovo is a village in Croatia.
