= Gornja Pačetina =

Coordinates: 46°06′47″N 15°52′34″E

- Village
- Interactive map of Gornja Pačetina
- Country: Croatia
- County: Krapina-Zagorje County

Area
  - Total: 0.89 sq mi (2.3 km^{2})

Population (2021)
  - Total: 377
  - Density: 420/sq mi (160/km^{2})
- Time zone: UTC+1 (CET)
  - Summer (DST): UTC+2 (CEST)

Gornja Pačetina is a village in Croatia.
