= Stara Ves Petrovska =

Coordinates: 46°09′14″N 15°50′20″E

- Village
- Interactive map of Stara Ves Petrovska
- Country: Croatia
- County: Krapina-Zagorje County

Area
  - Total: 1.1 km^{2} (0.42 sq mi)

Population (2021)
  - Total: 148
  - Density: 130/km^{2} (350/sq mi)
- Time zone: UTC+1 (CET)
  - Summer (DST): UTC+2 (CEST)

Stara Ves Petrovska is a village in Croatia.
