= Donja Plemenšćina =

Coordinates: 46°11′N 15°45′E

- Village
- Interactive map of Donja Plemenšćina
- Country: Croatia
- County: Krapina-Zagorje County

Area
  - Total: 1.8 km^{2} (0.69 sq mi)

Population (2021)
  - Total: 133
  - Density: 74/km^{2} (190/sq mi)
- Time zone: UTC+1 (CET)
  - Summer (DST): UTC+2 (CEST)

Donja Plemenšćina is a village in Croatia.
