= Štuparje =

Coordinates: 46°09′N 15°49′E

- Village
- Interactive map of Štuparje
- Country: Croatia
- County: Krapina-Zagorje County

Area
  - Total: 2.8 km^{2} (1.1 sq mi)

Population (2021)
  - Total: 362
  - Density: 130/km^{2} (330/sq mi)
- Time zone: UTC+1 (CET)
  - Summer (DST): UTC+2 (CEST)

Štuparje is a village in Croatia.
