= Krapina =

Town in Krapina-Zagorje, Croatia

- Town
- Grad Krapina; Town of Krapina
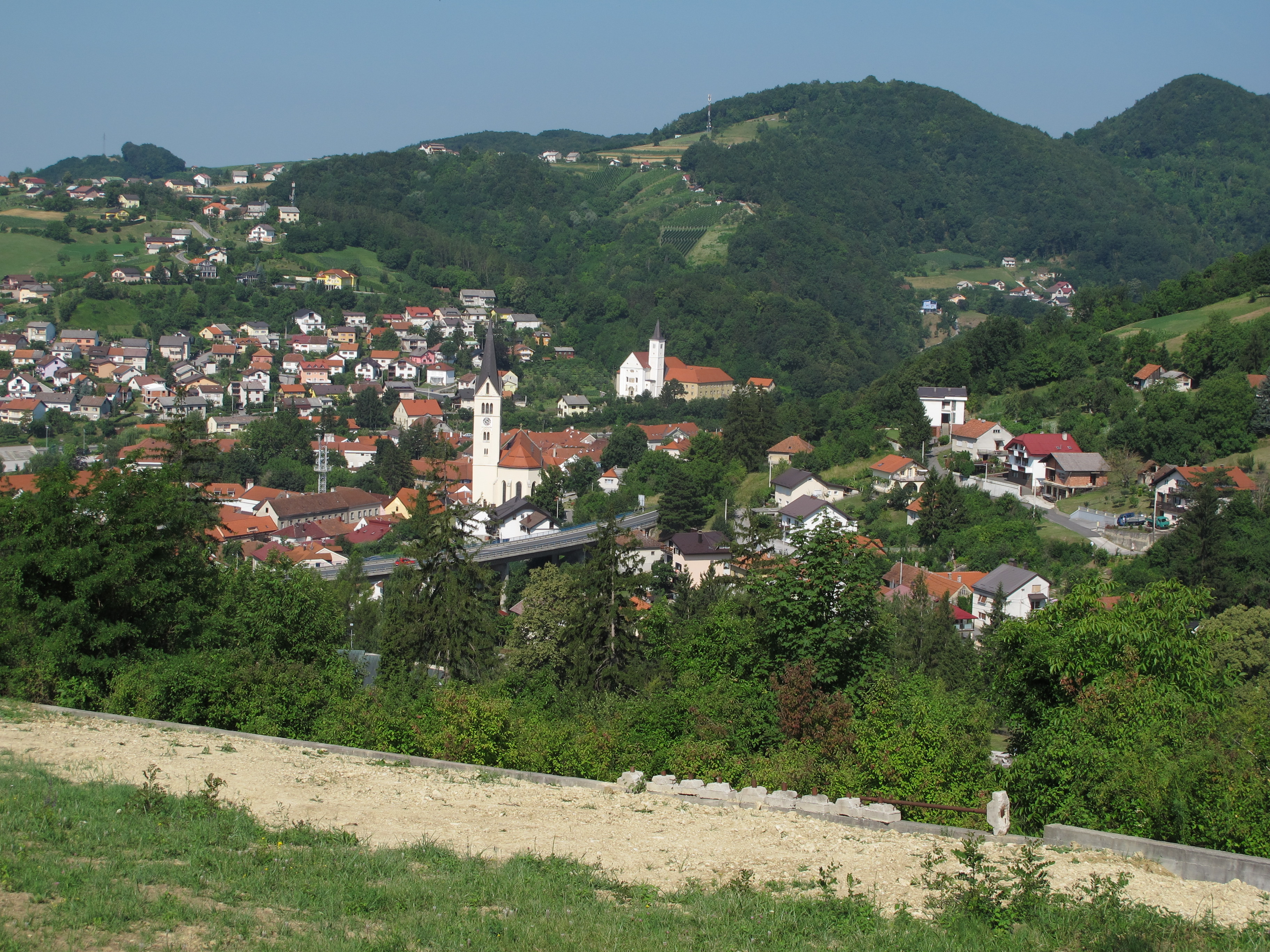
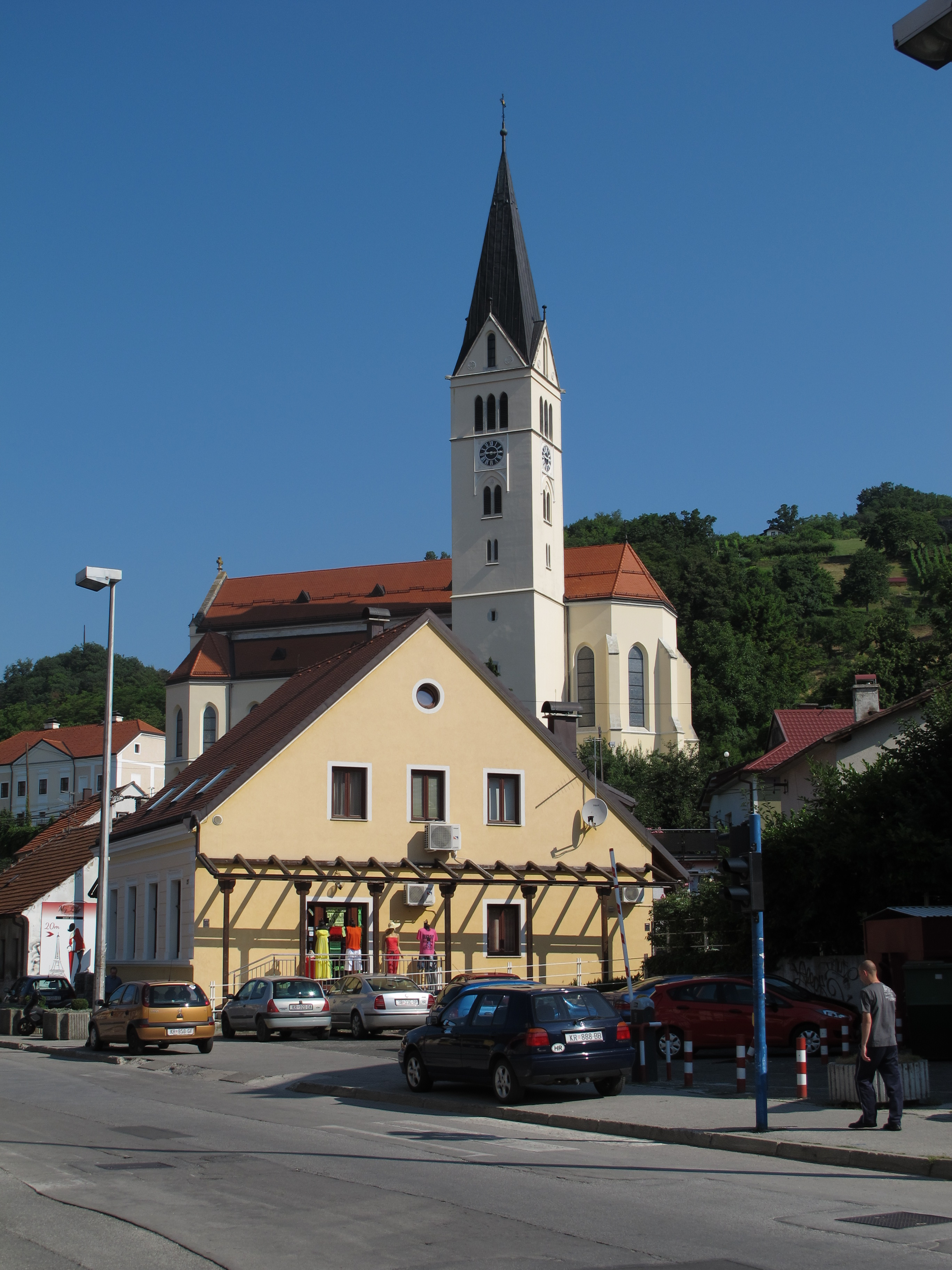
- Top: View on Krapina; Bottom: Town center

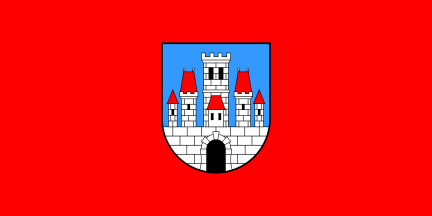
- Flag
- Interactive map of Krapina
- Location of Krapina in Croatia Krapina (Croatia)
- Coordinates: 46.16°N 15.87°E
- Country: Croatia
- Region: Central Croatia (Hrvatsko Zagorje)
- County: Krapina-Zagorje County

Government
  - Mayor: Zoran Gregurović (HDZ)
  - City Council: 15 members

Area
  - Town: 47.7 km^{2} (18.4 sq mi)
  - Urban: 2.5 km^{2} (0.97 sq mi)
- Elevation: 203 m (666 ft)

Population (2021)
  - Town: 11,530
  - Density: 242/km^{2} (626/sq mi)
  - Urban: 4,201
  - Urban density: 1,700/km^{2} (4,400/sq mi)
- Time zone: UTC+1 (CET)
  - Summer (DST): UTC+2 (CEST)
- Postal code: HR-49 000
- Area code: +385 49
- Vehicle registration: KR
- Website: krapina.hr

Krapina (pronounced [krâpina]; Hungarian: Korpona) is a town in northern Croatia and the administrative centre of Krapina-Zagorje County with a population of 4,201 and a total municipality population of 11,530. Krapina is located in the Zagorje region of Croatia, approximately 55 km (34 mi) from both Zagreb and Varaždin.

== History ==
=== Prehistoric site ===
In 1899, on a hill called Hušnjakovo near modern Krapina, the archaeologist and paleontologist Dragutin Gorjanović-Kramberger found over 800 fossil remains of Neanderthals.

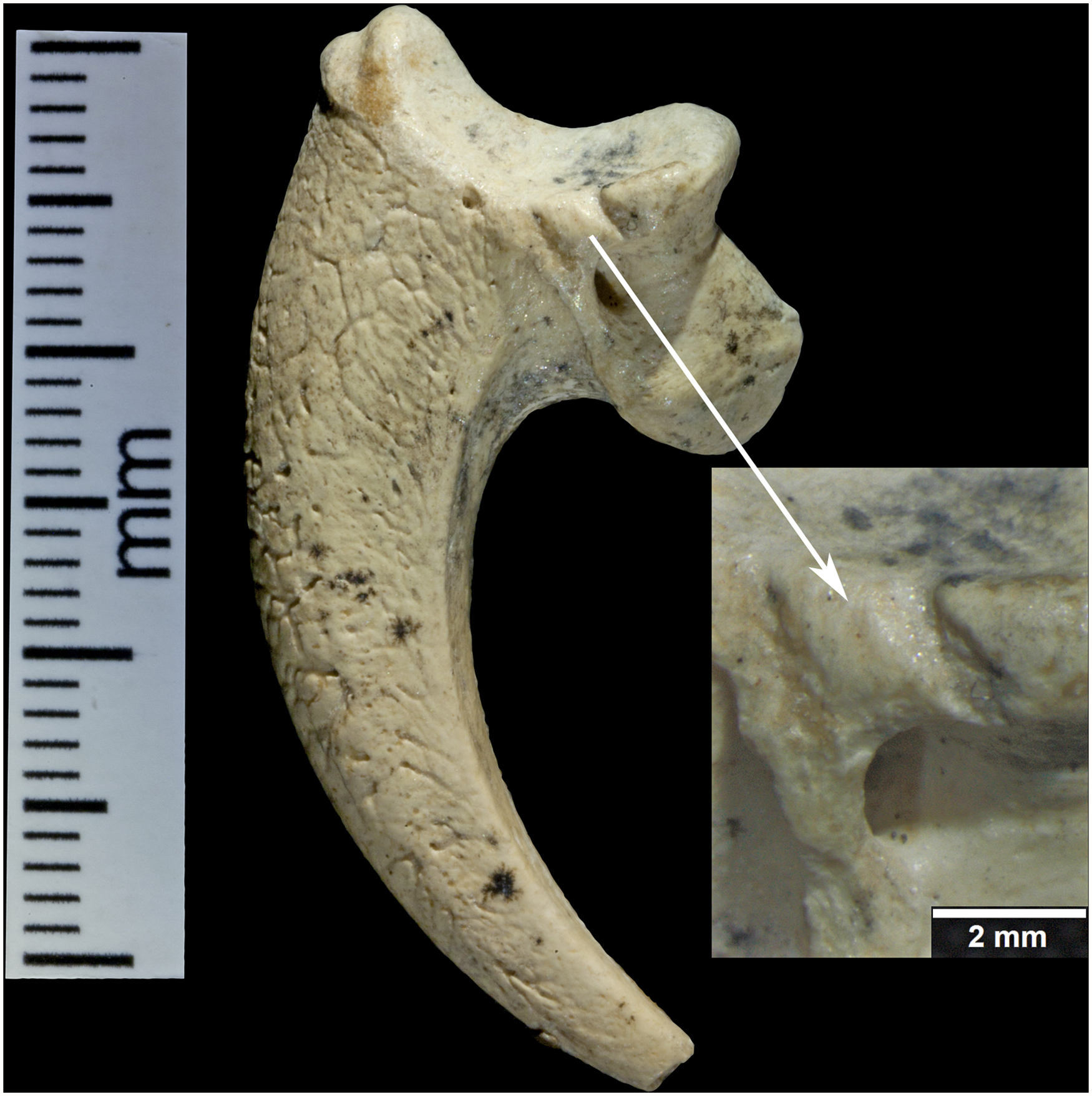
Proposed Neandertal jewelry: white-tailed eagle claw with striations at the Neanderthal site of Krapina, Croatia, circa 130,000 BP.

The half-cave in Krapina was soon listed among the world's science localities as a significant fossil finding site, where the largest and richest collection of the Neanderthal man had ever been found.

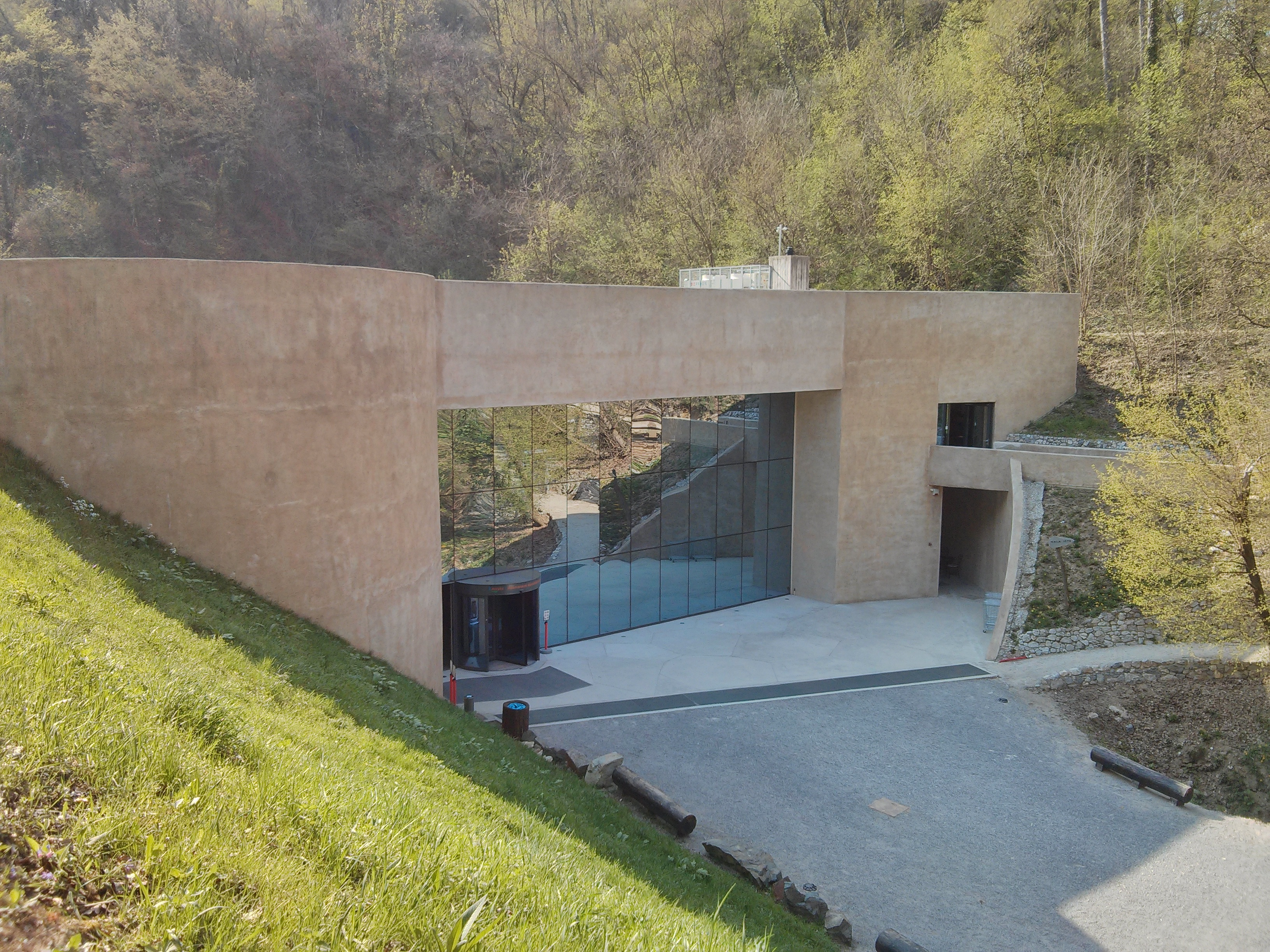
Krapina Neanderthal Museum

At the site where the Neanderthal remains were discovered there is now a state-of-the-art Neanderthal museum which also includes an extensive section on evolution, making it one of the most interesting evolutionary museums in Europe. It is surrounded by a park with many statues of Neanderthals and the game they hunted, a bear, a moose and a beaver set in the actual locations.

=== Middle ages and Ottoman invasions ===
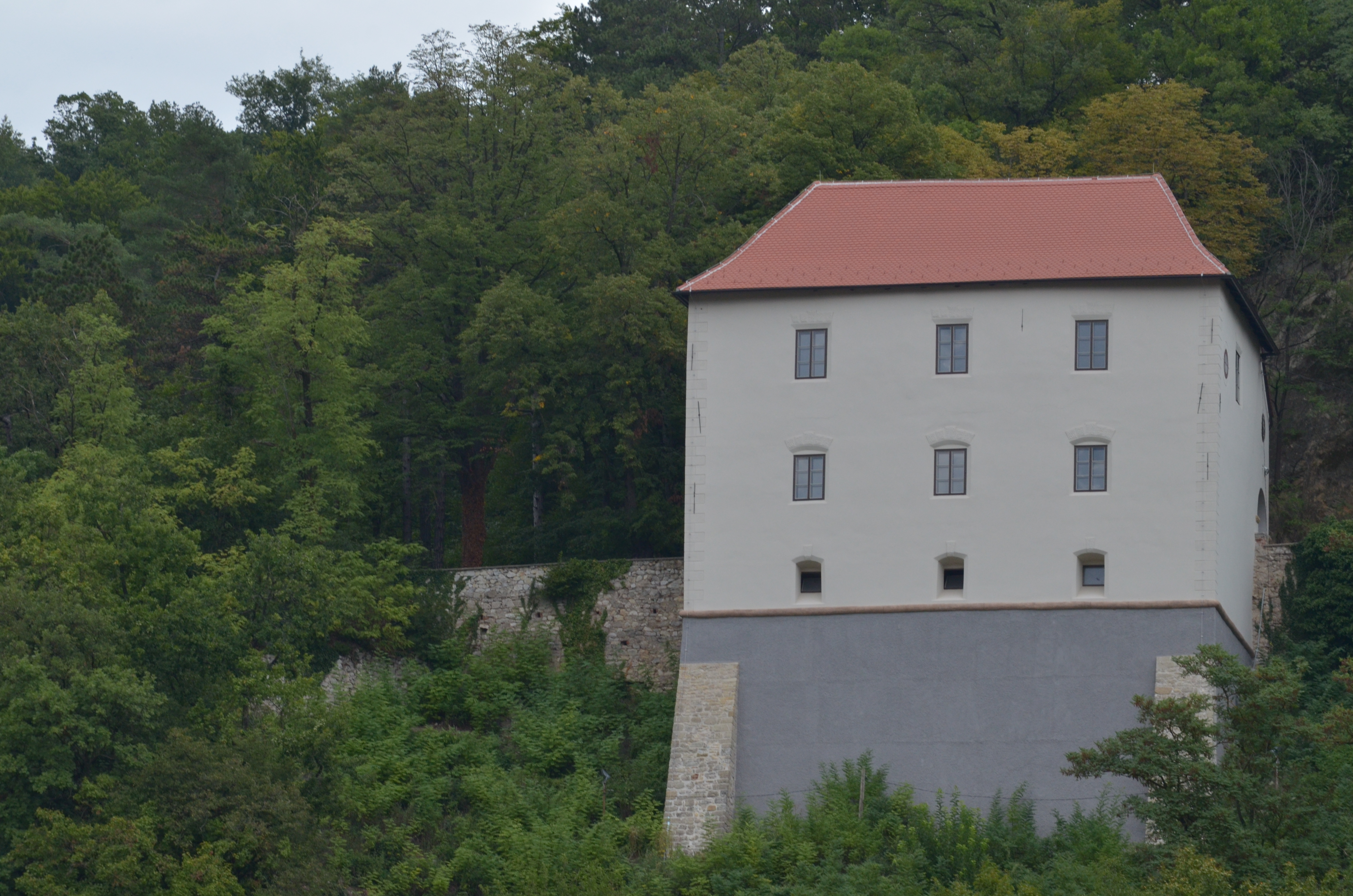
Krapina castle

Krapina was first mentioned in 1193 by Kalán Bár-Kalán, bishop of Pécs and ban of Croatia and Dalmatia. In 1347, Hungarian king Louis I granted Krapina the status of a free royal city.

During the Ottoman invasions of Croatia, at the end of the 16th and beginning of the 17th century, the Croatian Sabor convened five times in the Krapina fortress (in 1598, 1599, 1600, 1605 and 1607).

== Climate ==
Since records began in 1993, the highest temperature recorded at the local weather station at an elevation of 202 metres (663 ft) was 39.1 °C (102.4 °F), on 8 August 2017. The coldest temperature was −18.5 °C (−1.3 °F), on 10 February 2005. At the KL station, the coldest temperature was −22.0 °C (−7.6 °F), on 13 February 1985.

== Demographics ==
In the 2021 census, Krapina had a total of 11,530 inhabitants. Croats were an absolute majority at 97.29%.

The following settlements comprise the Krapina municipality:

- Bobovje, population 457
- Doliće, population 413
- Donja Šemnica, population 797
- Gornja Pačetina, population 377
- Krapina, population 4,201
- Lazi Krapinski, population 61
- Lepajci, population 354
- Mihaljekov Jarek, population 444
- Podgora Krapinska, population 543
- Polje Krapinsko, population 613
- Pretkovec, population 52
- Pristava Krapinska, population 213
- Strahinje, population 286
- Straža Krapinska, population 44
- Škarićevo, population 593
- Šušelj Brijeg, no population
- Tkalci, population 402
- Trški Vrh, population 400
- Velika Ves, population 722
- Vidovec Krapinski, population 183
- Vidovec Petrovski, population 66
- Zagora, population 88
- Žutnica, population 221
Town of Krapina: Population trends 1857–2021
v

population	5457	6060	6435	7007	7538	8141	7884	8224	9222	9473	10384	11533	12540	12938	12950	12480	11530
	1857	1869	1880	1890	1900	1910	1921	1931	1948	1953	1961	1971	1981	1991	2001	2011	2021

Sources: Croatian Bureau of Statistics publications

== Administration ==
The current mayor of Krapina is Zoran Gregurović (HDZ) and the Krapina Town Council consists of 15 seats.

Groups	Councilors per group
HDZ-ZS-ZDS-DHSS-HSU	9 / 15
SDP	3 / 15
Independents	3 / 15

== Culture ==
Krapina is home to the yearly Festival kajkavske popevke (The festival of kajkavian song) sung in the local Kajkavian language.

There is also a nearby municipality of Krapinske Toplice (Krapina spa) with numerous thermal springs and spa tourist infrastructure. Krapina is also the birthplace of the linguist and language reformer Ljudevit Gaj. His home is now a museum where visitors can learn about his life and work.

Since 1997, Franciscan monastery and St. Catherine's church in Krapina are hosts of the Krapinafest, annual contemporary Christian music festival.

== Sports ==
The local chapter of the HPS is HPD "Strahinjščica", which had 48 members in 1936 under the Josip Kompare presidency. Membership fell to 35 in 1937.

== Notable people ==
- Ljudevit Gaj (1809–1872), was a Croatian linguist, politician, journalist, and writer
- Mirko Dražen Grmek (1924–2000), Croatian and French historian of medicine
- Josip Seissel (1904-1987), Croatian architect and urban planner

== Transportation ==
Krapina is served by the A2 freeway and state road D1. It has a train station on the R106 corridor and a bus station which also serves as a hub for the bus company "Presečki d.o.o." - the company connects Krapina with numerous towns across the county and region.

== See also ==
- List of caves on Kostelsko gorje
- List of caves on Strahinjčica
