= Mali Tabor =

- Village
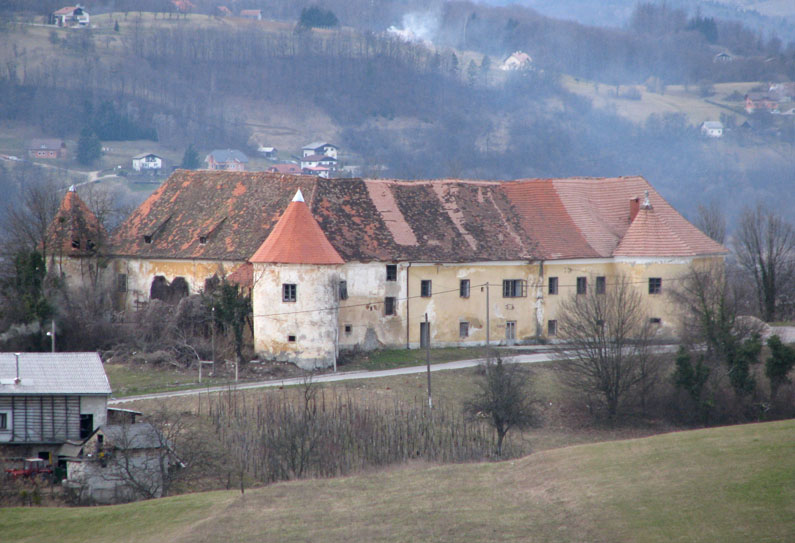
- Interactive map of Mali Tabor
- Location within Croatia
- Coordinates: 46°12′50″N 15°40′30″E
- Country: Croatia
- County: Krapina-Zagorje County
- Municipality: Hum na Sutli

Area
  - Total: 2.9 km^{2} (1.1 sq mi)

Population (2021)
  - Total: 311
  - Density: 110/km^{2} (280/sq mi)
- Time zone: UTC+1 (CET)
  - Summer (DST): UTC+2 (CEST)

Mali Tabor is a small village within the municipality of Hum na Sutli in Croatia and has a medieval castle as centre of the village.
