= Hum na Sutli =

- Interactive map of Hum na Sutli
- Location within Croatia
- Coordinates: 46°12′50″N 15°41′25″E
- Country: Croatia
- County: Krapina-Zagorje County

Government
  - Mayor: Nikola Drašković (SDP)

Area
  - Total: 36.9 km^{2} (14.2 sq mi)

Population (2021)
  - Total: 4,592
  - Density: 124/km^{2} (322/sq mi)
- Time zone: UTC+1 (CET)
  - Summer (DST): UTC+2 (CEST)
- Website: humnasutli.hr

Hum na Sutli (lit. 'Hum on the Sutla') is a village and a municipality in the Krapina-Zagorje County of Croatia.

== History ==
Mali Tabor, located in the municipality, is a Baroque castle that used to be a fort. Historical documents mention it in 1511 as Kys Thabor. Through later marriages, Mali Tabor came into the ownership of the Jelačić family, and then Baron Kavanagh, whose descendants held the castle until the end of World War II.

== Demographics ==
In the 2021 census, there were 4,592 inhabitants in the municipality, in the following settlements:

- Brezno Gora, population 61
- Donje Brezno, population 95
- Druškovec Gora, population 68
- Druškovec Humski, population 360
- Gornje Brezno, population 258
- Grletinec, population 192
- Hum na Sutli, population 957
- Klenovec Humski, population 337
- Lastine, population 164
- Lupinjak, population 343
- Mali Tabor, population 311
- Orešje Humsko, population 172
- Poredje, population 207
- Prišlin, population 387
- Rusnica, population 170
- Strmec Humski, population 163
- Vrbišnica, population 245
- Zalug, population 102

In the same census, the absolute majority of population were Croats at 93.23%.

Hum na Sutli: Population trends 1857–2021
v

population	4683	4936	5213	5628	5771	6309	6015	6262	6448	6403	6004	6194	5902	5740	5476	5060	4592
	1857	1869	1880	1890	1900	1910	1921	1931	1948	1953	1961	1971	1981	1991	2001	2011	2021

Sources: Croatian Bureau of Statistics publications

== Administration ==
The current mayor of Hum na Sutli is Nikola Drašković (SDP) and the Hum na Sutli Municipal Council consists of 13 seats.

Groups	Councilors per group
SDP	8 / 13
Free voters group	3 / 13
Independent	1 / 13
HDZ	1 / 13
