= Hrvatsko Zagorje =

Region in northern Croatia

Coordinates: 46°6′N 16°0′E

Hrvatsko zagorje Zagorje
- Geographic region^{a}
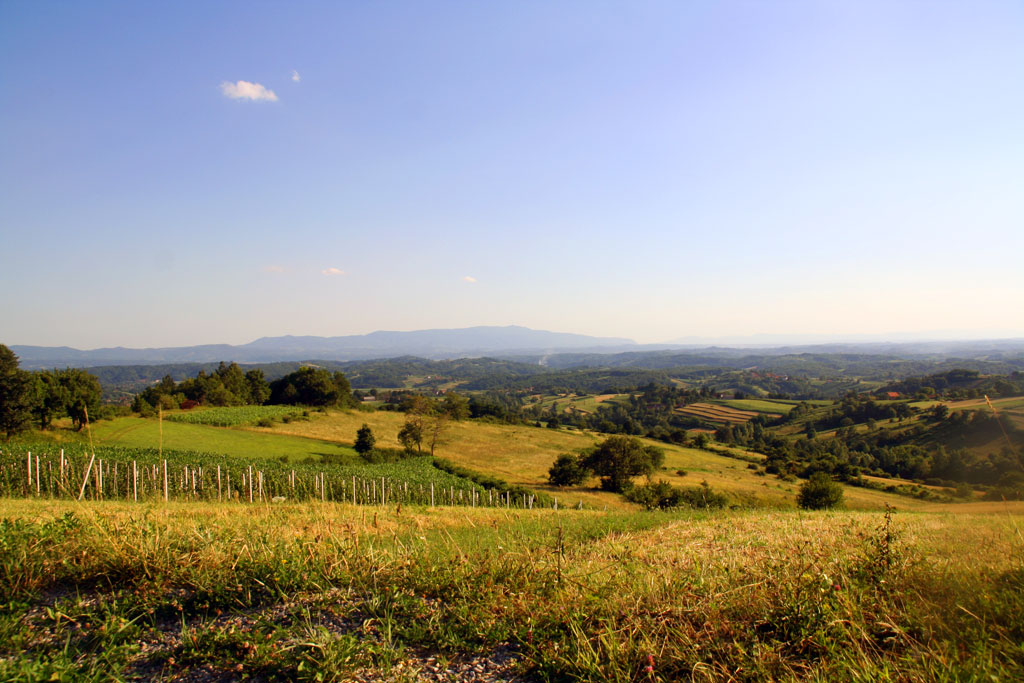
- Typical Zagorje panorama
- Etymology: Croatian: zagorje, lit. 'land beyond the hills'
- Hrvatsko zagorje (marked in green) comprises the whole of Krapina-Zagorje County, and parts of Varaždin and Zagreb Counties.
- Country: Croatia
- Traditional capital: Krapina
- Largest city: Zaprešić

Area^{b}
  - Total: 2,147 km^{2} (829 sq mi)

Population (2011)^{c}
  - Total: 300,000 (approx.)
  - Density: 140/km^{2} (360/sq mi)
- ^{a} Hrvatsko Zagorje is not designated as an official region, it is a geographic region only.

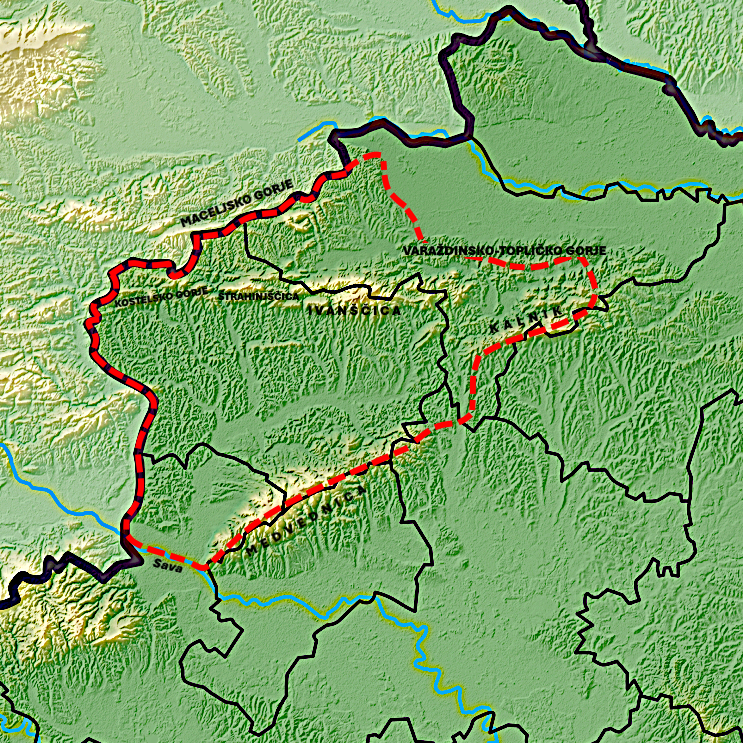
Relief map of Hrvatsko Zagorje. The red dashed line represents an approximate geographical boundary of the region.

Hrvatsko zagorje (pronounced [xř̩ʋatsko zǎːɡorje]; Croatian Zagorje; zagorje is Croatian for 'backland' or 'beyond the hills') is a cultural region in northern Croatia, traditionally separated from the country's capital Zagreb by the Medvednica mountains. It comprises the whole area north of Mount Medvednica up to Slovenia in the north and west, and up to the regions of Međimurje and Podravina in the north and east. The population of Zagorje is not recorded as such, as it is administratively divided among Krapina-Zagorje County (total population 142,432), and western and central part of Varaždin County (total population 183,730). The population of Zagorje can be reasonably estimated to exceed 300,000 people.

In Croatia, the area is usually referred to simply as Zagorje (Croatian for 'backland' or 'beyond the hills'; with respect to Medvednica). However, to avoid confusion with the nearby Zagorje ob Savi in Slovenia, the Croatian part is called Hrvatsko zagorje, meaning 'Croatian Zagorje'.

The town of Krapina is often referred to as the cultural capital of Kajkavian dialect (Croatian: Kajkavščina), the Croatian dialect spoken in north-western Croatia. Every year, the Festival of Kajkavian Song (Croatian: Festival kajkavske popevke) takes place in Krapina.

Traditional manufacturing of children's wooden toys in Hrvatsko Zagorje has been listed by Unesco as Intangible Cultural Heritage in 2009.

In 2026, part of Hrvatsko Zagorje was declared a nature park.

== Towns and villages ==
2011 Census:

- Zaprešić (25.495 people)
- Ivanec (13,758 people)
- Krapina (12,480 people)
- Zabok (8,994 people)
- Lepoglava (8,283 people)
- Bedekovčina (8,041 people)
- Pregrada (6,594 people)
- Sveti Križ Začretje (6,165 people)
- Oroslavje (6,138 people)
- Zlatar (6,096 people)
- Marija Bistrica (5,976 people)
- Donja Stubica (5,680 people)
- Krapinske Toplice (5,367 people)
- Gornja Stubica (5,284 people)
- Hum na Sutli (5,060 people)
- Veliko Trgovišće (4,945 people)
- Bednja (3,992 people)
- Jakovlje (3,930 people)
- Konjščina (3,790 people)
- Klanjec (2,915 people)

== Attractions ==
Its longest cave is Sutinščica in Mali Komor.

== Gallery ==
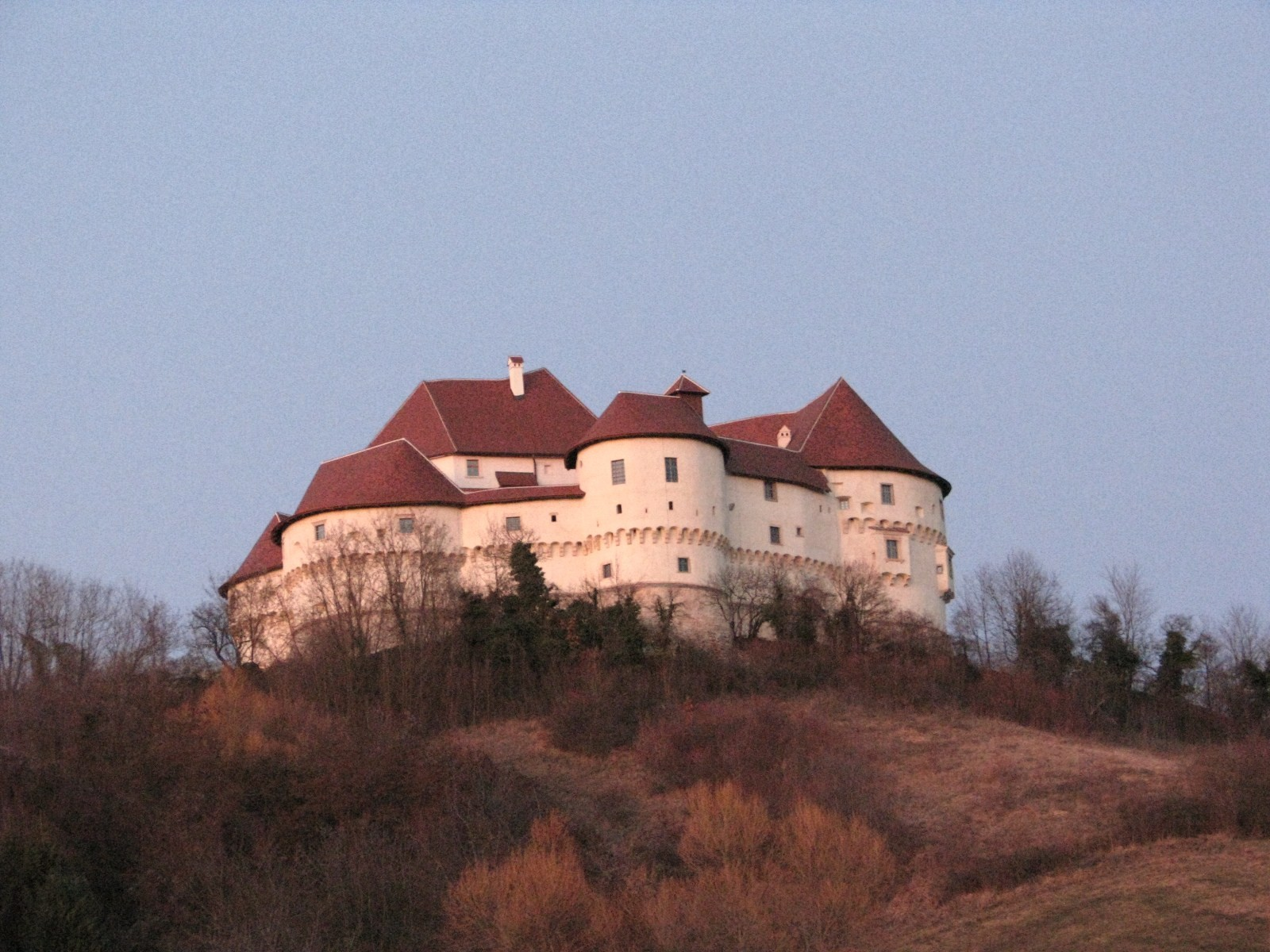
Veliki Tabor Castle

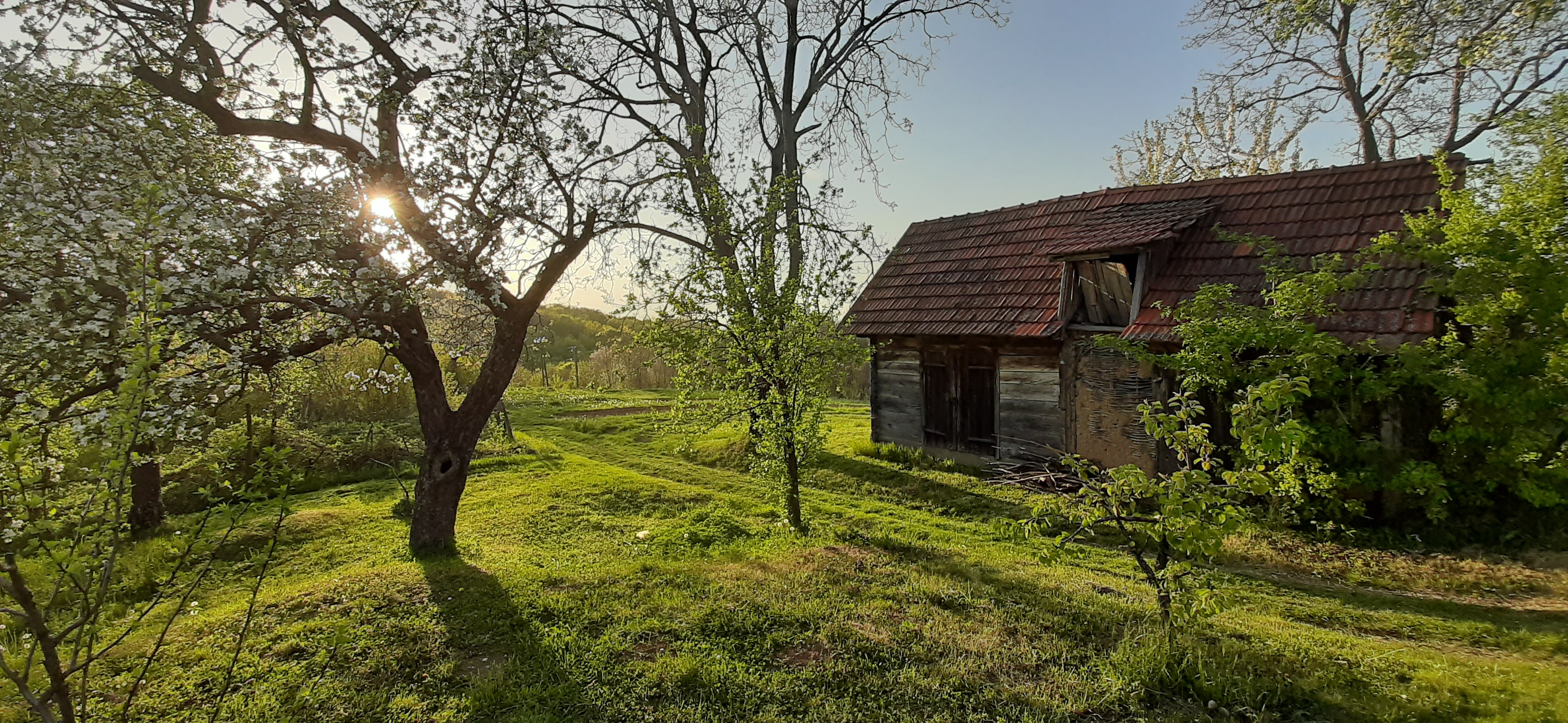
Scene of Hrvatsko Zagorje in a village near Marija Bistrica

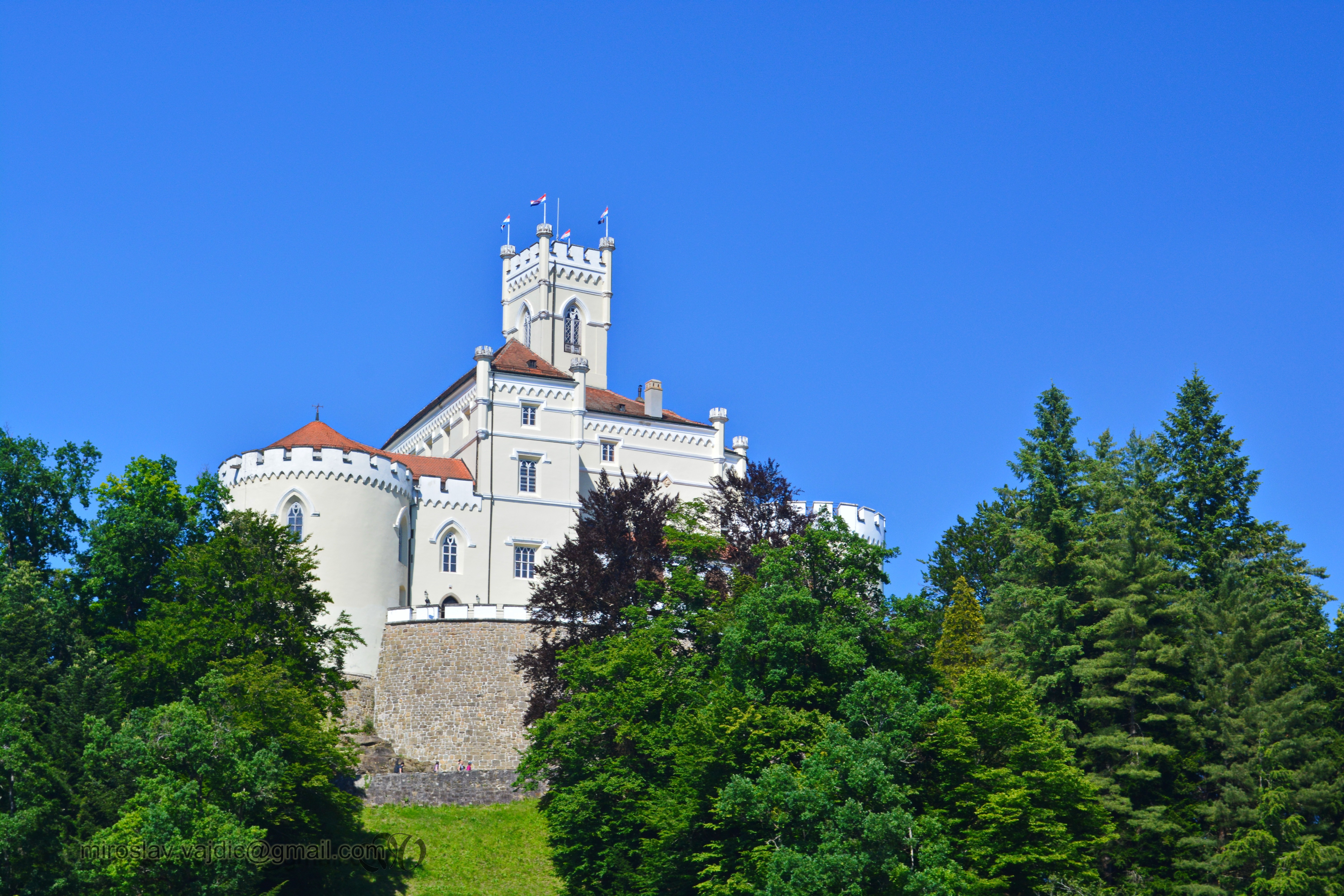
Trakošćan Castle

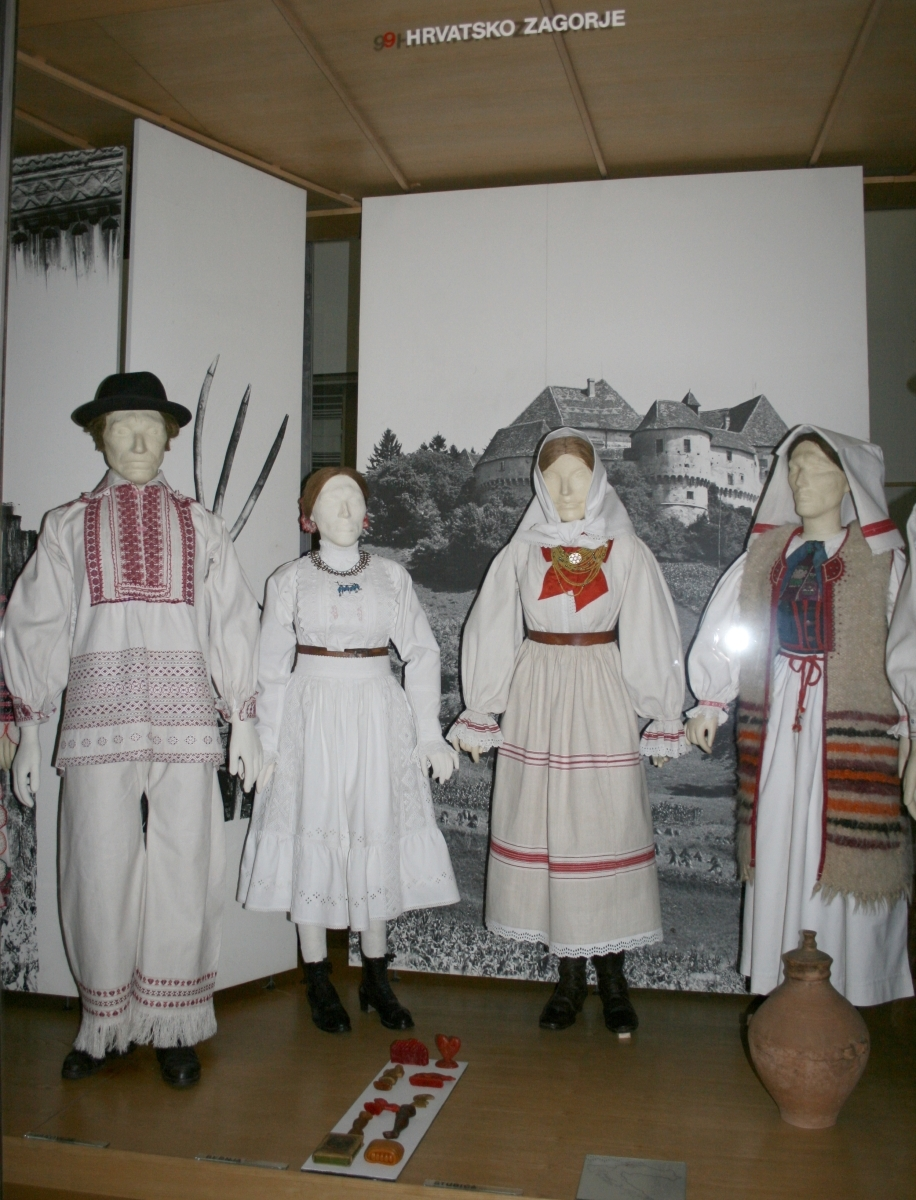
Traditional clothing of Hrvatsko Zagorje

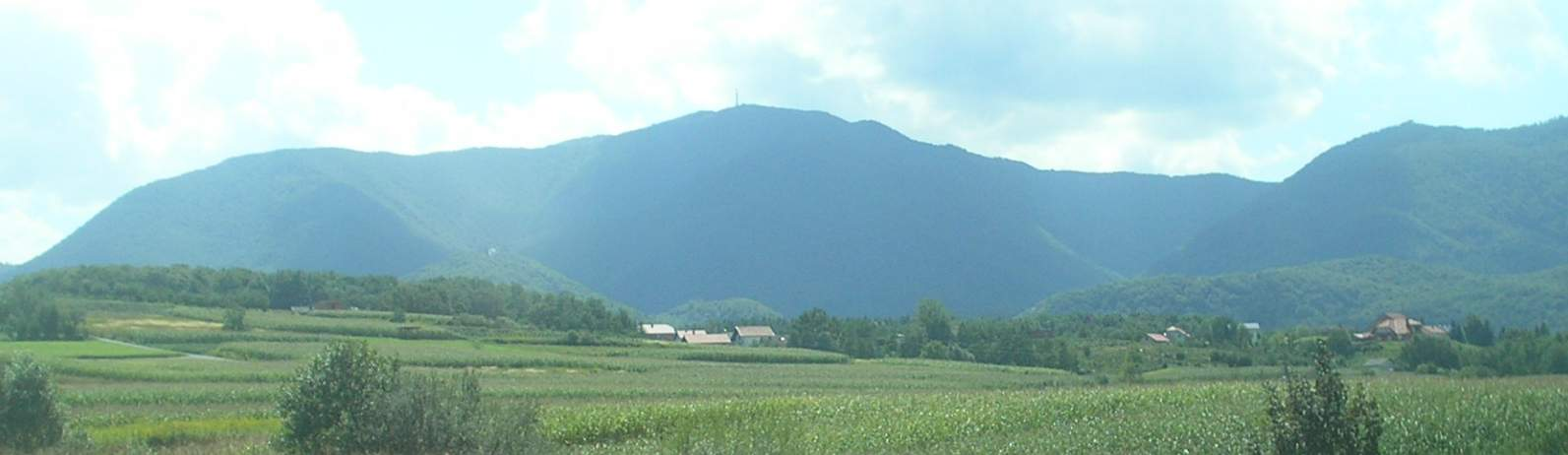
Ivanščica

== See also ==
- Geography of Croatia
- Zakarpattia and Záhorie (both contain similar geographic concepts)

== Bibliography ==
- Poljak, Željko (February 1959). "Ostali članci o Hrvatskom zagorju". Kazalo za "Hrvatski planinar" i "Naše planine" 1898—1958 [Miscelaneous articles on Croatian zagorje] (PDF). Naše planine (in Croatian). Vol. XI. pp. 5–6. ISSN 0354-0650.
