= Krapina-Zagorje County =

County in northern Croatia

Coordinates: 46.125°N 15.807°E

Krapina-Zagorje County Krapinsko-zagorska županija (Croatian)
- County
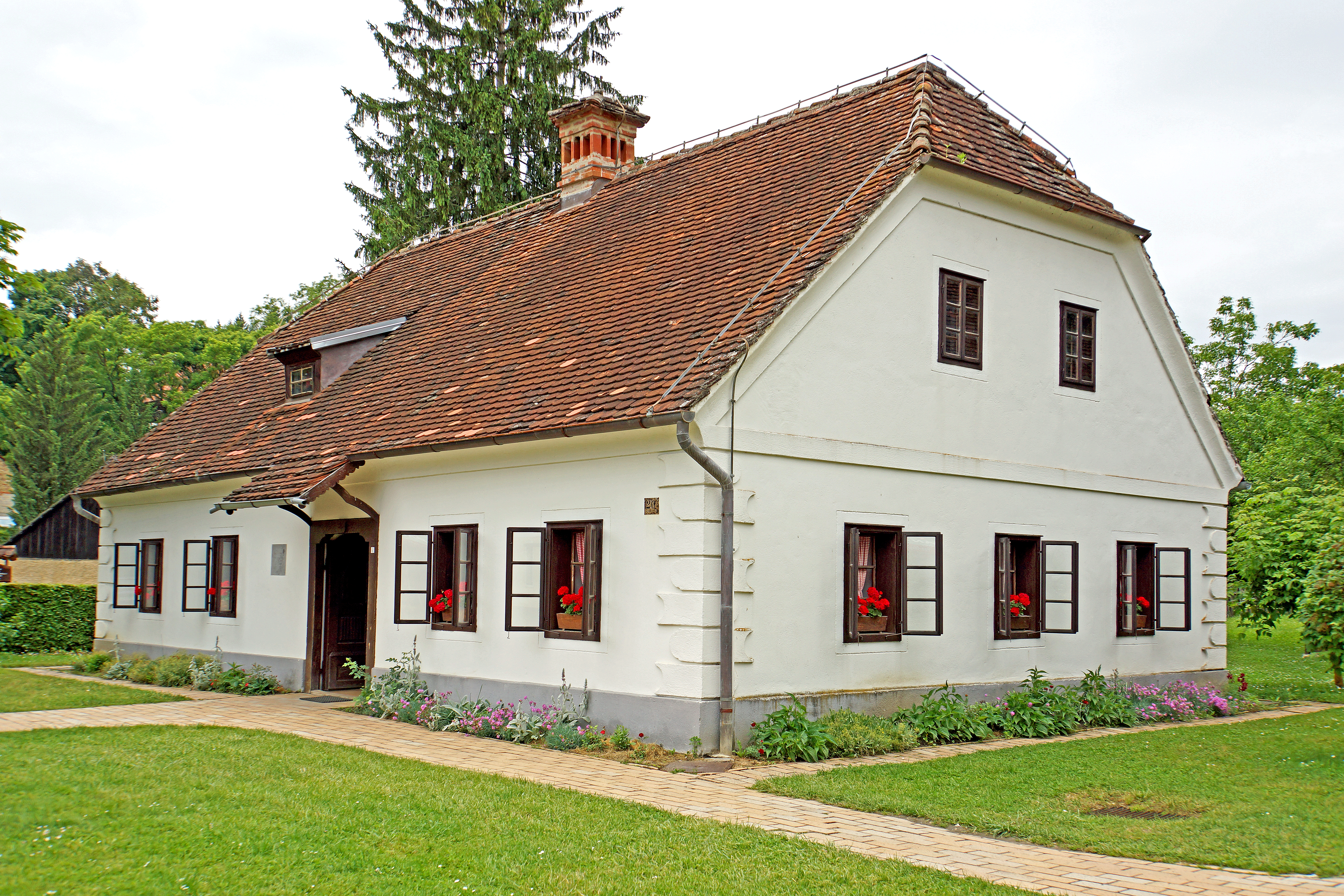
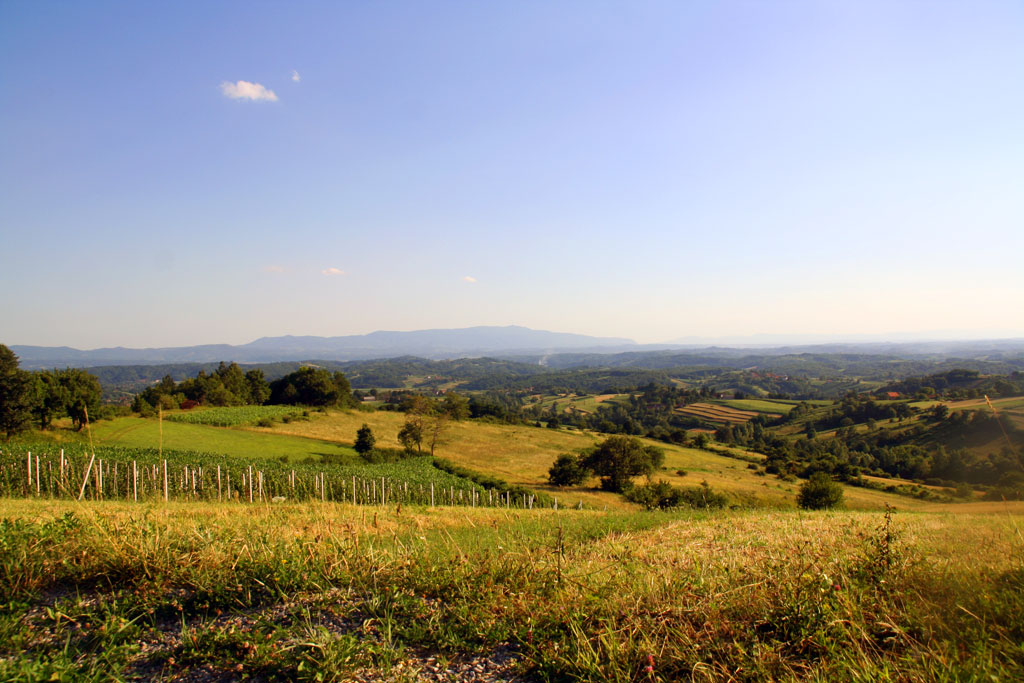
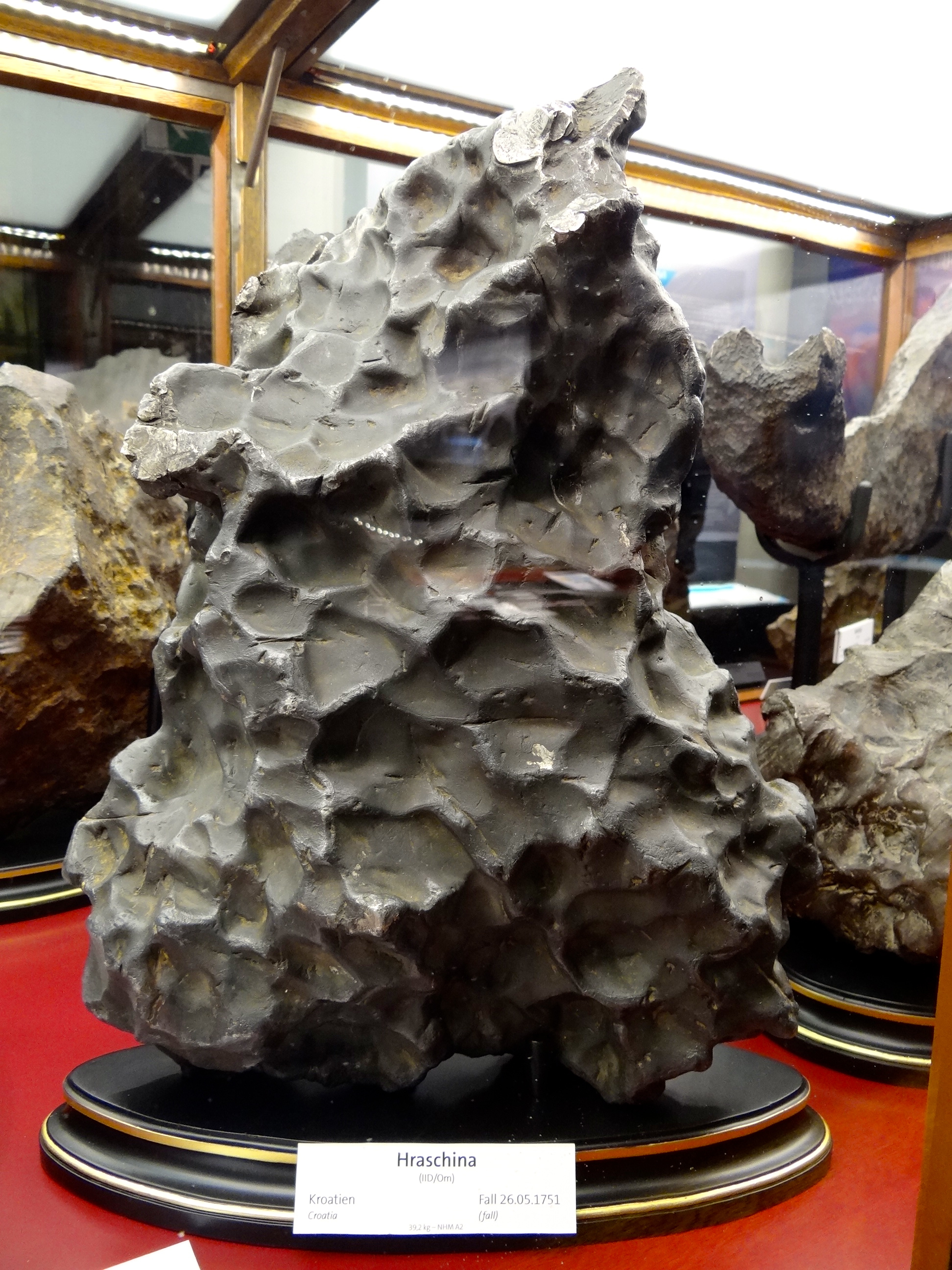
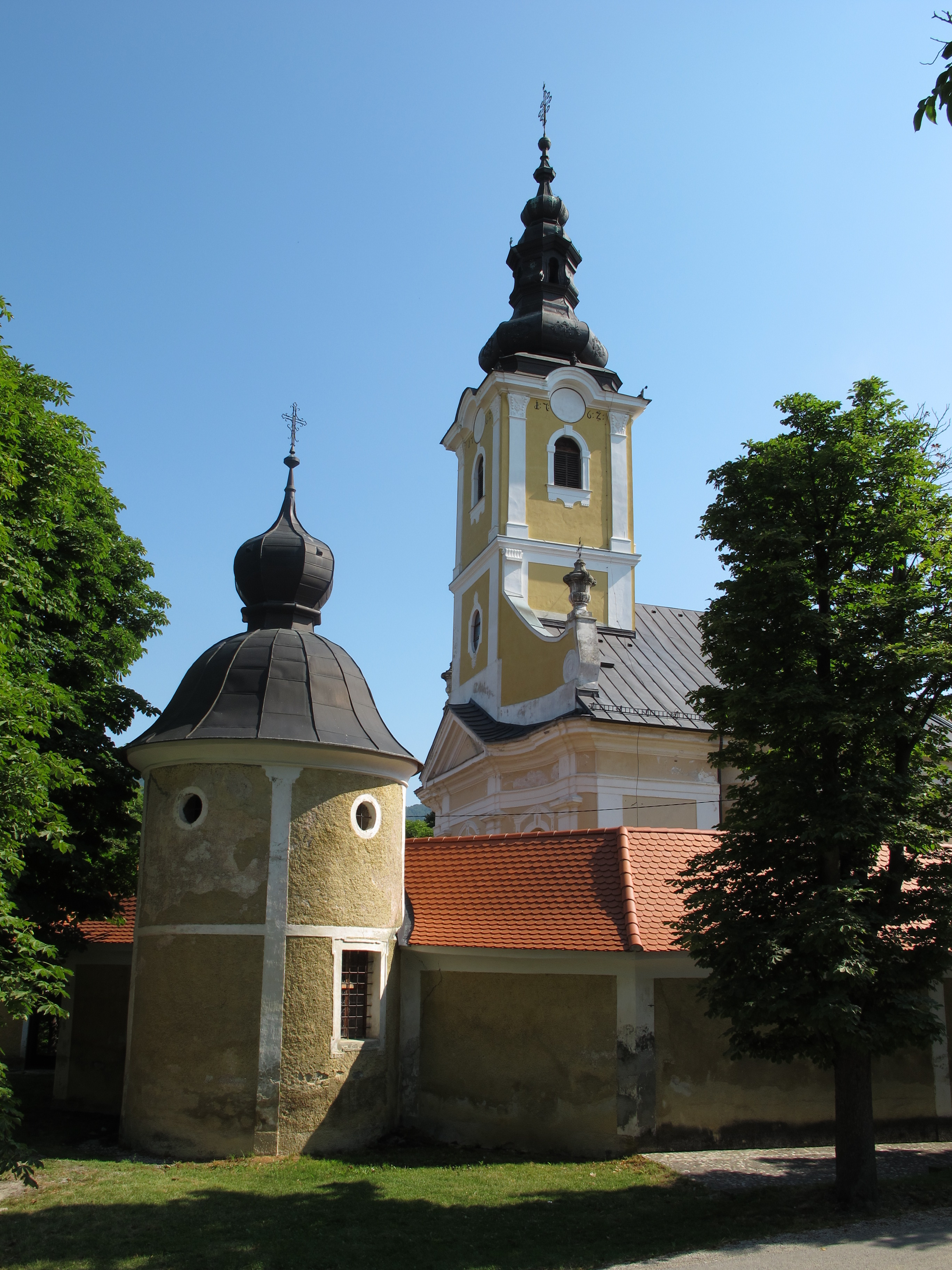
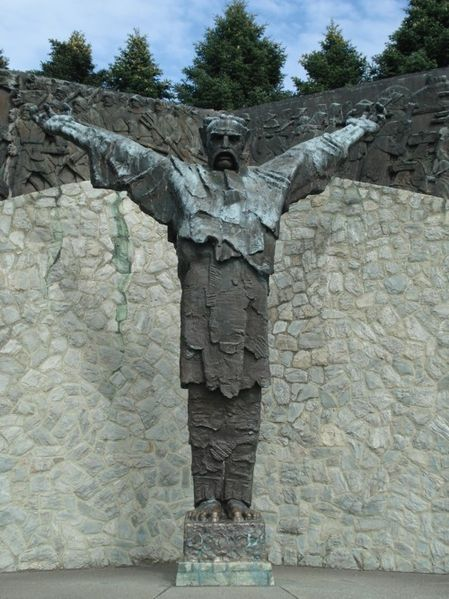
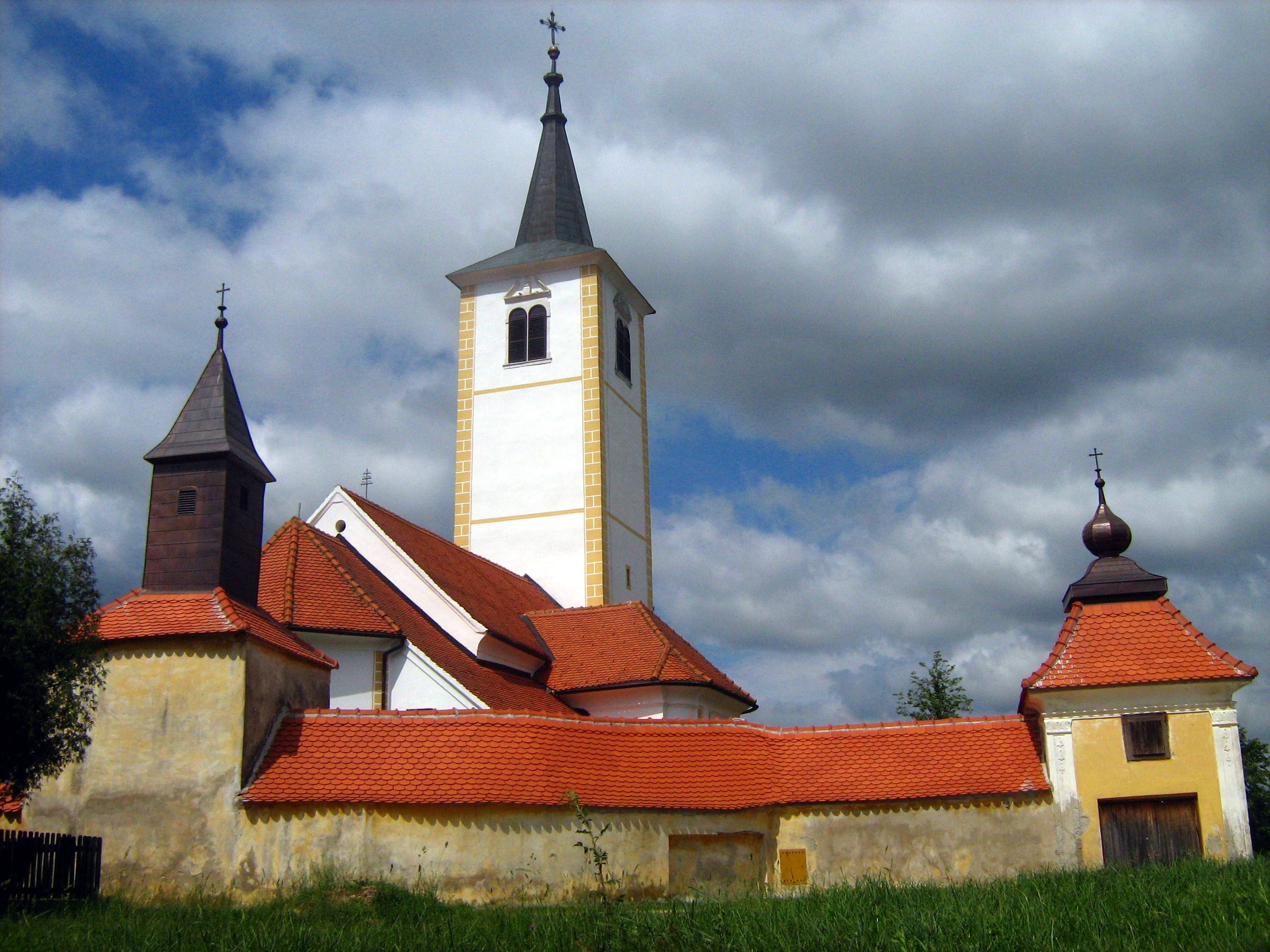
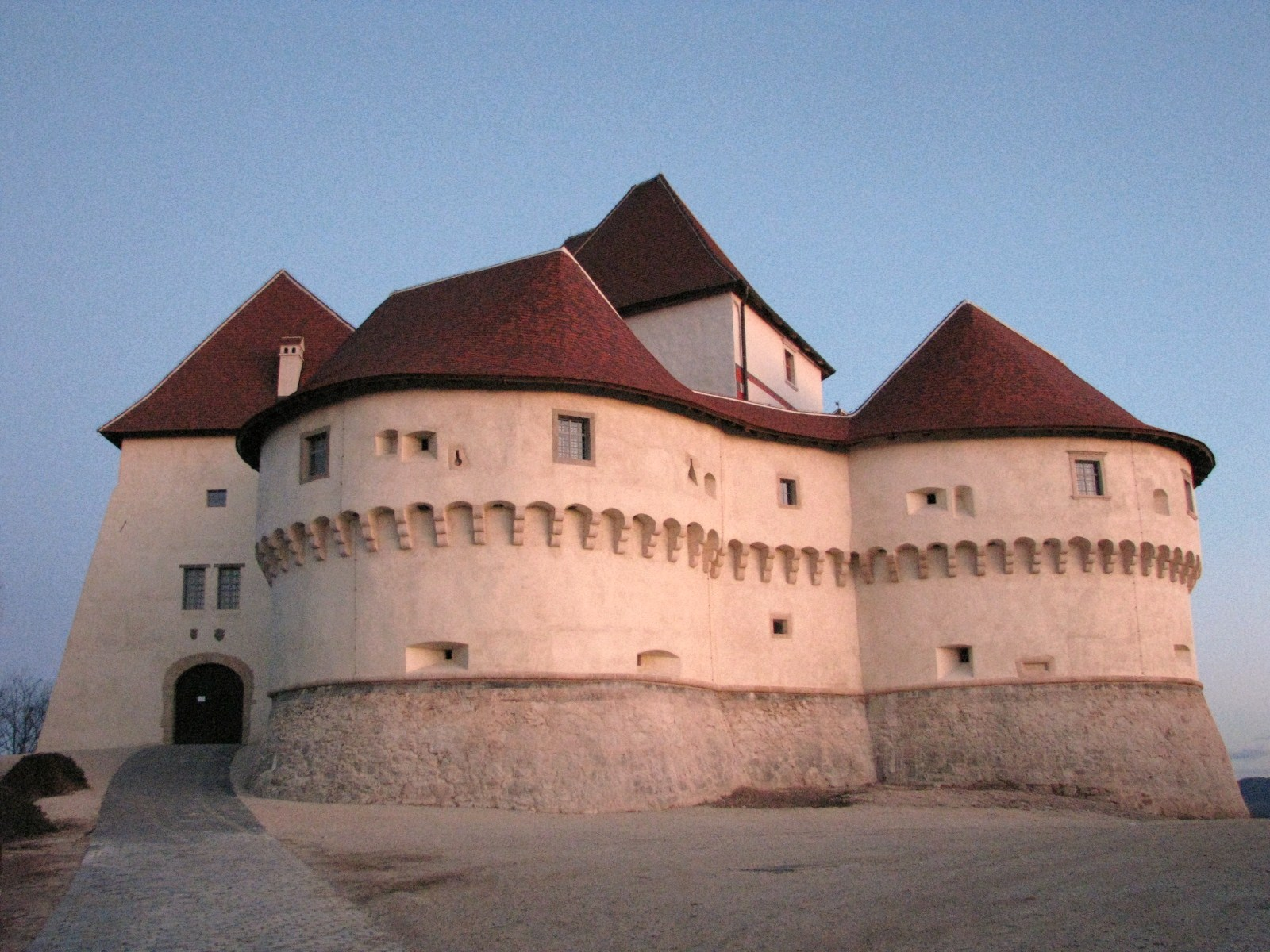
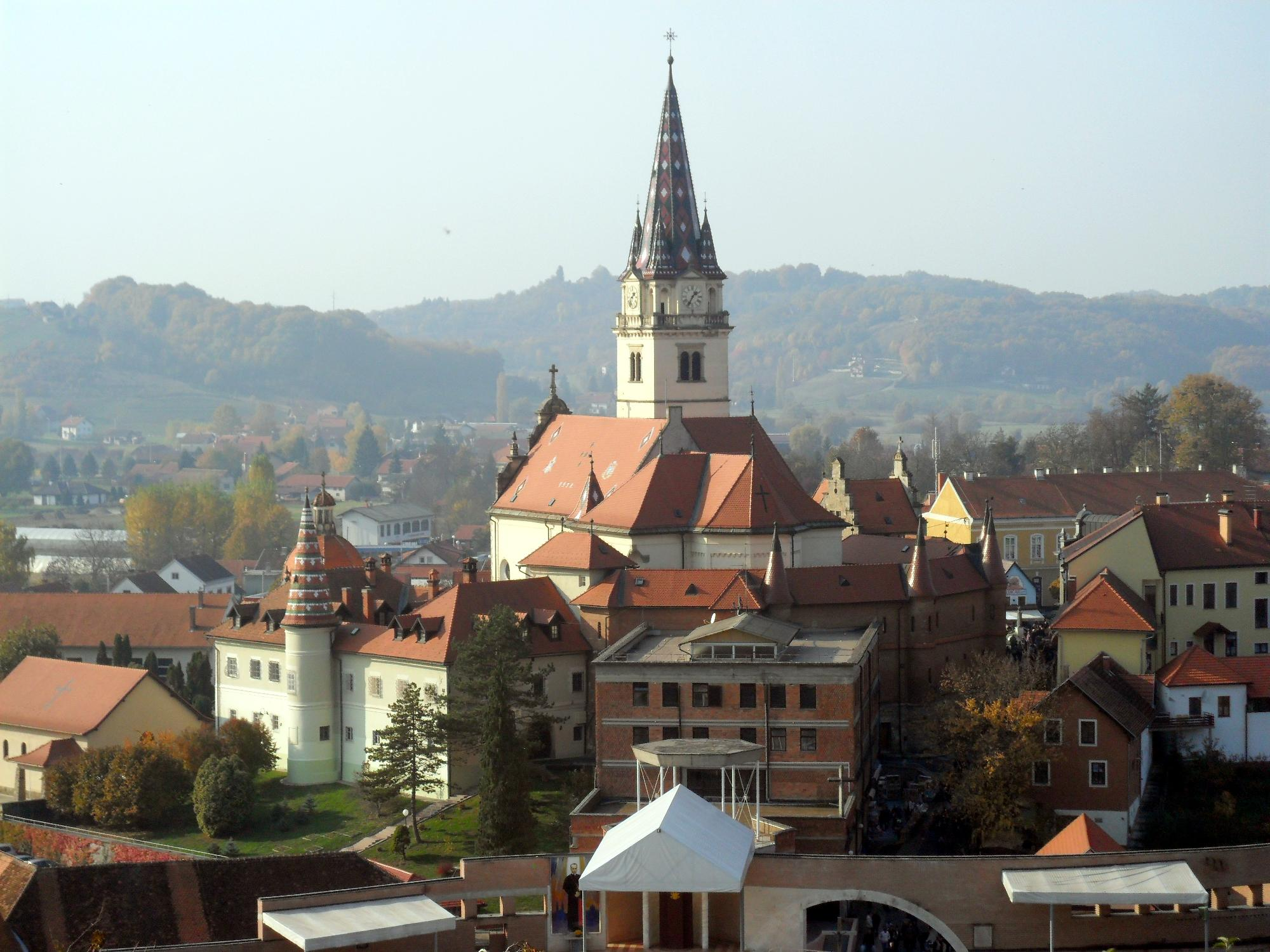

- Flag Coat of arms

- Krapina-Zagorje County within Croatia
- Country: Croatia
- County seat: Krapina

Government
  - Župan (Prefect): Željko Kolar (SDP)
  - Assembly: 41 members: • SDP, HNS, HSU, HL (24); • HDZ, HSP AS, HSS, ZDS (17)

Area
  - Total: 1,229 km^{2} (475 sq mi)

Population (2021)
  - Total: 120,702
  - Density: 98.21/km^{2} (254.4/sq mi)
- Area code: 049
- ISO 3166 code: HR-02
- HDI (2022): 0.836 very high · 16th
- Website: www.kzz.hr

Krapina-Zagorje County (pronounced [krâpina zǎːɡɔːrje], Croatian: Krapinsko-zagorska županija) is a county in northern Croatia, bordering Varaždin County in the northeast, Zagreb County in the southwest and southeast, City of Zagreb in the south and Slovenia in the northwest. It encompasses most of the historic region called Hrvatsko zagorje,

The area contains the excavation site of a 100,000-year-old Neanderthal man in caves near the central town of Krapina. The existence of Krapina itself has been verified since 1193, and it has been a common site for castles and other country houses of Croatian, Austrian and Hungarian rulers.

Other towns of the county are Zabok, Pregrada, Zlatar, Oroslavje, Donja Stubica, Klanjec. The town of Stubica features another thermal spring, Stubičke toplice (spa). Also in the area are the medieval castles Veliki Tabor, Miljana, Bežanec, Hellenbach, Milengrad etc.

There are many vineyards in the County.

== Geography ==
=== Climate ===
15% of the year, fog significantly lowers visibility in the area.

== Administrative division ==
Krapina-Zagorje County is divided into 7 towns or cities, 25 municipalities and 422 settlements:

- Town of Krapina (county seat)
- Town of Donja Stubica
- Town of Klanjec
- Town of Oroslavje
- Town of Pregrada
- Town of Zabok
- Town of Zlatar
- Municipality of Bedekovčina
- Municipality of Budinščina
- Municipality of Desinić
- Municipality of Đurmanec
- Municipality of Gornja Stubica
- Municipality of Hrašćina
- Municipality of Hum na Sutli
- Municipality of Jesenje
- Municipality of Konjščina
- Municipality of Kraljevec na Sutli
- Municipality of Krapinske Toplice
- Municipality of Kumrovec
- Municipality of Lobor
- Municipality of Mače
- Municipality of Marija Bistrica
- Municipality of Mihovljan
- Municipality of Novi Golubovec
- Municipality of Petrovsko
- Municipality of Radoboj
- Municipality of Stubičke Toplice
- Municipality of Sveti Križ Začretje
- Municipality of Tuhelj
- Municipality of Veliko Trgovišće
- Municipality of Zagorska Sela
- Municipality of Zlatar Bistrica

== Demographics ==
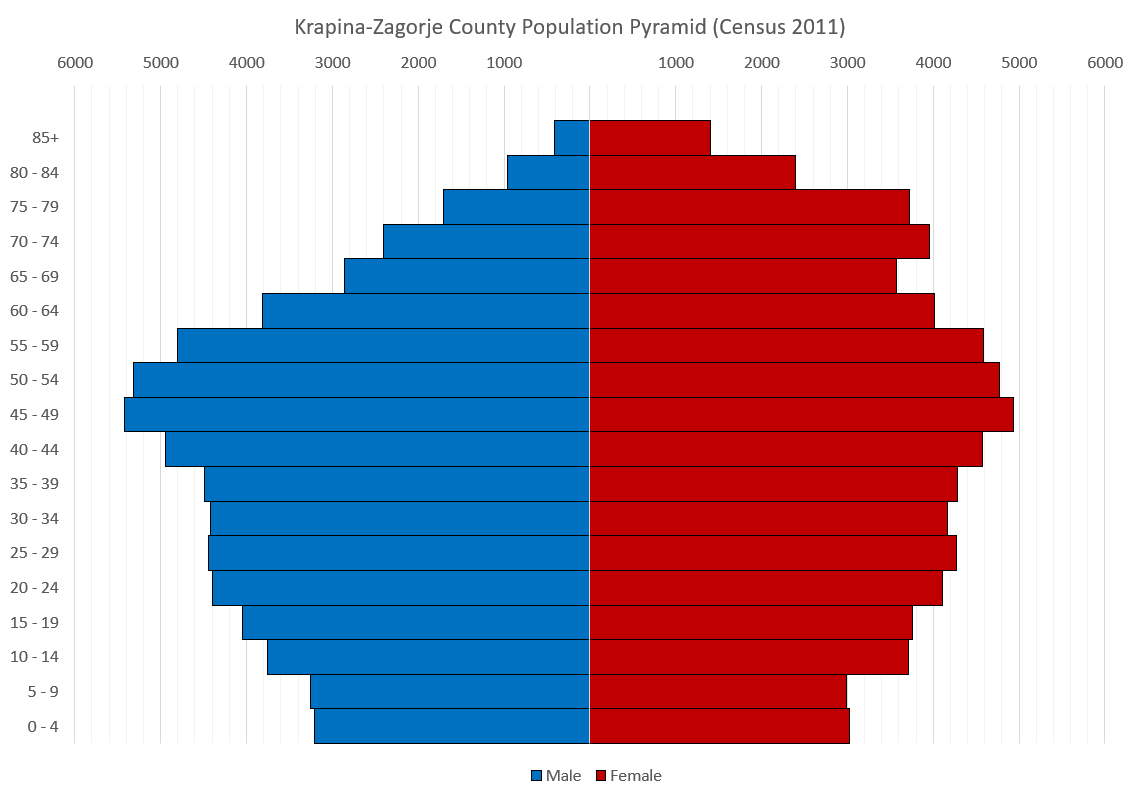
Population pyramid of Krapina-Zagorje county per the 2011 Census

Historical populations of Krapina-Zagorje County

Year	Pop.	±%
1857	100,804	—
1869	113,711	+12.8%
1880	125,394	+10.3%
1890	139,547	+11.3%
1900	152,047	+9.0%
1910	168,404	+10.8%
1921	163,594	−2.9%
1931	175,227	+7.1%
1948	181,586	+3.6%

Year	Pop.	±%
1953	178,938	−1.5%
1961	168,952	−5.6%
1971	161,247	−4.6%
1981	153,567	−4.8%
1991	148,779	−3.1%
2001	142,432	−4.3%
2011	132,892	−6.7%
2021	120,702	−9.2%

Source: Naselja i stanovništvo Republike Hrvatske 1857–2001, Croatian Bureau of Statistics, Zagreb, 2005

Since the late 1940s the county's population has been slowly shrinking. As of the 2021 census, the county had 120,702 residents. The population density is 98 people per km^{2}. Of the 120,702 residents, 61,925 were female and 58,777 were male.

Krapina-Zagorje County: Population trends 1857–2021
v

population	100804	113711	125394	139547	152047	168404	163594	175227	181586	178938	168952	161247	153567	148779	142432	132892	120942
	1857	1869	1880	1890	1900	1910	1921	1931	1948	1953	1961	1971	1981	1991	2001	2011	2021

Sources: Croatian Bureau of Statistics publications

Ethnic Croats form the majority with 97.89% of the population, followed by Slovenes (0.31%) and Serbs (0.13%), with other ethnicities making up the rest.

== Administration ==
The current prefect of Krapina-Zagorje County is Željko Kolar (SDP) and the Krapina-Zagorje County Assembly consists of 37 seats.

Groups	Members per group
SDP-HSS-Reformists	22 / 37
HDZ-HSU	11 / 37
Independents	4 / 37
