= Generalka =

Cave in Croatia

- Špilja Generalski Stol
- Location within Croatia
- Interactive map of Generalka
- Location: Lepoglava
- Coordinates: 46.19644°N 16.05184°E
- Depth: 5 metres (16 ft)
- Length: ?
- Elevation: 623
- Discovery: 7 November 2009
- Geology: Karst cave
- Entrances: 2
- Cadastral code: HR00287

Generalka is a cave in Zagorje with a 25 metres (82 ft) horizontal passage length, located on the north slope of the Ivanščica massif, above the rock quarry Vudelja that opened in 1935 for road building purposes. It is a dry horizontal cave, and small, but complex. It is difficult to access, but a tourist path has been planned.

== Description ==
The cave is located on the Generalski Stol plateau of Ivanščica. The cave formed in Anisian dolomite under a combination of tectonic, erosive, and corrosive conditions. It is small, so at 6 points its passages remain incompletely explored because of narrowness alone. But its passages form a complex network of 4 interconnected passages. The cave likely continues to the northwest towards a second entrance.

Speleothems include stalactites, stalagmites, and flowstone, along with the occasional stalagnate and coralloids.

A map of the cave drawn in 2009 by Tomica Matišić.

== History ==
Cavers from the newly founded HSS section Kraševski Zviri discovered the cave on 7 November 2009. The cave had long been known to locals. A cache of spitzer bullets in the cave was found at the bottom of the entrance pit. They returned on the 14th and widened the very narrow entrance, removing the cache. They then mapped the cave topographically. A microclimate expedition was undertaken on 15 April 2012, during which the cave was systematically photographed.

== Climate ==
A strong wind emanates from the lower entrance, indicating the presence of an upper entrance. The air temperature of the cave is 9.8 °C (49.6 °F), with a soil temperature of 9.7 °C (49.5 °F). The relative humidity is 98%.

== Biology ==
Fauna include Araneae and Gastropoda.

== Tourism ==
A tourist path has been planned from Šumec to Bračkova jama and Bračkova špilja, and from there to Voska luknja and Voska špilja, then to Šumec and Karlova špilja, then to Generalka and Polušpilja Generalski Stol.

== See also ==
- List of caves on Očura

== Bibliography ==
- Risek, Ljiljana (September 2010). "Prvi jamski sustav na Ivančici dubine preko 50 metara? Poučna staza povezivat će devet špilja i jama na lepoglavskom području" [The First Cave System on Ivančica Deeper than 50 Metres? An Educational Trail will Connect Nine Caves and Pits in the Lepoglava Area] (PDF). Lepoglavski gradski list (in Croatian). Vol. 3, no. 7. p. 14. ISSN 1847-7143.
- Matišić, Tomica (2012). "Speleološki objekti Ivanščice na području Lepoglave: Dopuna katastra speleoloških objekata Ivanščice" [Speleological Objects of the Lepoglava Area: Supplement to the Cadastre of Speleological Objects of Ivanščica]. Ivanečka škrinjica (in Croatian). 7 (8): 16–45. ISSN 1845-710X.
- Novak, Ruđer (2013). "Generalka". Čisto podzemlje (in Croatian).
- Speleološka udruga "Kraševski zviri" (2015). "Generalka". Katastar speleoloških objekata Republike Hrvatske (in Croatian).
- Kraš, Valentina (2017-08-24) [defended 2017-07-13]. Pregled stanja speleoloških objekata u Varaždinskoj županiji [Survey of the State of Speleological Objects in Varaždin County] (Thesis) (in Croatian). Geotehnički fakultet Sveučilišta u Zagrebu.
- Javna ustanova za upravljanje zaštićenim dijelovima prirode Varaždinske županije (2021-04-26). "Na vrhu Ivančice obilježen Dan planeta zemlje" [Earth Day Commemorated on the Peak of Ivančica]. Priroda Varaždinske županije (in Croatian).
