= Komor =

Komor may refer to:

- Komor or Komor Rud, a village in Iran
- Komor (surname), includes a list of people with the name
- Mali Komor, a village near Mače, Croatia
- Veliki Komor, a village near Mače, Croatia
