= Karlova špilja =

Cave in Croatia

- Location within Croatia
- Interactive map of Karlova špilja
- Location: Lepoglava
- Coordinates: 46.1936°N 16.0321°E
- Depth: 0 metres (0 ft)
- Length: 8.5 metres (28 ft)
- Elevation: 556 metres (1,824 ft)
- Discovery: March 2010
- Geology: Karst cave
- Entrances: 1
- Cadastral code: HR00306

Karlova špilja is a cave in Zagorje about 14 metres (46 ft) long, located on the north slope of the Ivanščica massif. It is a dry horizontal cave with a passage length of 8.5 metres (28 ft). It is difficult to access, but a tourist path has been planned. Its close proximity to the Šumec cave and paleolontological potential have made it a target of interest for local speleologists and paleontologists.

== Description ==
Like Bračkova špilja and Voska luknja, the cave is located in the ravine of the Šumec, which cuts through the Dubrava peak. It is horizontal, wider at the entrance than in the passages. There are two passages from the entrance. The passage on the right narrows and remains unexplored. The passage on the left is longer is longer but narrow and ends with an impassible widening. All passages are only accessible by crawling, but digging may widen them and has been recommended in conjunction with archaeological investigation.

A map of the cave was drawn in 2012 by Tomica Matišić exists.

== History ==
Cavers from the HSS section Kraševski Zviri discovered the entrance in March 2010. The cave was mapped in July 2012.

== Climate ==
The air temperature of the cave is 12 °C (54 °F), with a soil temperature of 13 °C (55 °F). The relative humidity is 86%.

== Geology ==
The cave is situated in Middle Triassic dolomitic limestone. Speleothems include coralloids and flowstone.

== Biology ==
The moth Scoliopteryx libatrix and cricket Troglophilus cavicola have been found in the cave. There is minor biowaste hazard in the cave from its continued use by a small predator, likely a fox, and the restricted space.

== Tourism ==
A tourist path has been planned from Šumec to Bračkova jama and Bračkova špilja, and from there to Voska luknja and Voska špilja, then to Šumec cave and Karlova špilja, then to Generalka and Polušpilja Generalski Stol.

== See also ==
- List of caves on Očura

== Bibliography ==
- Risek, Ljiljana (September 2010). "Prvi jamski sustav na Ivančici dubine preko 50 metara? Poučna staza povezivat će devet špilja i jama na lepoglavskom području" [The First Cave System on Ivančica Deeper than 50 Metres? An Educational Trail will Connect Nine Caves and Pits in the Lepoglava Area] (PDF). Lepoglavski gradski list (in Croatian). Vol. 3, no. 7. p. 14. ISSN 1847-7143.
- Matišić, Tomica (2012). "Speleološki objekti Ivanščice na području Lepoglave: Dopuna katastra speleoloških objekata Ivanščice" [Speleological Objects of the Lepoglava Area: Supplement to the Cadastre of Speleological Objects of Ivanščica]. Ivanečka škrinjica (in Croatian). 7 (8): 16–45. ISSN 1845-710X.
- Speleološka udruga "Kraševski zviri" (2015). "Karlova špilja". Katastar speleoloških objekata Republike Hrvatske (in Croatian).
- Kraš, Valentina (2017-08-24) [defended 2017-07-13]. Pregled stanja speleoloških objekata u Varaždinskoj županiji [Survey of the State of Speleological Objects in Varaždin County] (Thesis) (in Croatian). Geotehnički fakultet Sveučilišta u Zagrebu.
- Prigorski (2023-10-06). "Podzemno bogatstvo: Prije mjesec dana otkrivena najdublja jama u Varaždinskoj županiji" [How Beautiful is Zagorje the Green - and Deep: Speleologists Discovered the Deepest Cave in Zagorje by Ivanec]. Prigorski.hr (in Croatian).
