= Voska špilja =

Cave in Croatia

- Location within Croatia
- Interactive map of Voska špilja
- Location: Očura
- Coordinates: 46.19283°N 16.02809°E
- Depth: 0
- Length: 7.4 metres (24 ft)
- Elevation: 623 metres (2,044 ft)
- Discovery: May 2012
- Geology: Karst cave
- Entrances: 1
- Cadastral code: HR00308

Voska špilja is a cave on the north slope of the Ivanščica massif. Its horizontal length of 7.4 metres (24 ft), without a vertical difference. A potential continuation exists, but could only be passed with widening. It is located near Voska luknja but at a higher elevation. The entrance is very difficult to access, but a tourist path has been planned.

== Name ==
The name Voska špilja is Kajkavian for "Narrow Cave" (Croatian: Uska).

== Description ==
The cave is located on the slopes of the Dubrava peak. It is geomorphologically identical to Voska luknja, with a triangular shaped semi-tectonic entrance. A potential continuation exists, but could only be passed with widening. Judging from the passage orientation and significant wind into the entrance, Matišić concluded it might be connected to Voska luknja.

Speleothems are intact, thanks to its inaccessibility.

A map of the cave was drawn on 6 May 2012 by Marko Hajduk.

== History ==
Cavers from the newly founded HSS section Kraševski Zviri discovered first explored it in May 2012.

== Climate ==
The air temperature of the cave is 12.0 °C (53.6 °F), and its soil temperature 12.1 °C (53.8 °F). Its relative humidity is 87%.

== Biology ==
A Rhinolophus species was identified, and the cave is home to a large Troglophilus cavicola population.

== Tourism ==
A tourist path has been planned from Šumec to Bračkova jama and Bračkova špilja, and from there to Voska luknja and Voska špilja, then to Šumec and Karlova špilja, then to Generalka and Polušpilja Generalski Stol.

== See also ==
- List of caves on Očura

== Bibliography ==
- Risek, Ljiljana (September 2010). "Prvi jamski sustav na Ivančici dubine preko 50 metara? Poučna staza povezivat će devet špilja i jama na lepoglavskom području" [The First Cave System on Ivančica Deeper than 50 Metres? An Educational Trail will Connect Nine Caves and Pits in the Lepoglava Area] (PDF). Lepoglavski gradski list (in Croatian). Vol. 3, no. 7. p. 14. ISSN 1847-7143.
- Risek, Ljiljana (2011-08-09). "Voska luknja po svojim je dimenzijama najveći poznati speleološki objekt na planini Ivančici; speleolozima je intrigantna jer još uvijek joj ne znaju veličinu" [Voska Luknja is by its Dimensions the Largest Known Speleological Object on Mount Ivančica; It is Intriguing to Speleologists Because They Still Do Not Know Its Size]. Večernji list (in Croatian). eISSN 1333-9222.
- Matišić, Tomica (2012). "Speleološki objekti Ivanščice na području Lepoglave: Dopuna katastra speleoloških objekata Ivanščice" [Speleological Objects of the Lepoglava Area: Supplement to the Cadastre of Speleological Objects of Ivanščica]. Ivanečka škrinjica (in Croatian). 7 (8): 16–45. ISSN 1845-710X.
- Speleološka udruga "Kraševski zviri" (2015). "Voska špilja". Katastar speleoloških objekata Republike Hrvatske (in Croatian).
- Kraš, Valentina (2017-08-24) [defended 2017-07-13]. Pregled stanja speleoloških objekata u Varaždinskoj županiji [Survey of the State of Speleological Objects in Varaždin County] (Thesis) (in Croatian). Geotehnički fakultet Sveučilišta u Zagrebu.
- prigorski.hr (2023-10-06). "Podzemno bogatstvo: Prije mjesec dana otkrivena najdublja jama u Varaždinskoj županiji" [How Beautiful is Zagorje the Green - and Deep: Speleologists Discovered the Deepest Cave in Zagorje by Ivanec]. Prigorski (in Croatian).
