= Mali Bukovec =

Mali Bukovec may refer to:

- Mali Bukovec, Varaždin County, a village and a municipality in Croatia
- Mali Bukovec, Krapina-Zagorje County, a village near Mače, Croatia
