= Bračkova špilja =

Cave in Croatia

- Bračkova peć, Bračkova pečina
- Location within Croatia
- Interactive map of Bračkova špilja
- Location: Lepoglava
- Coordinates: 46.19738°N 16.03328°E
- Depth: 0 metres (0 ft)
- Length: 14 metres (46 ft) (Note: 12.5 metres (41 ft) as measured in 2008.)
- Elevation: 350 metres (1,150 ft)
- Geology: Karst cave
- Entrances: 1
- Cadastral code: HR01847

Bračkova špilja is a cave and archaeological site in Zagorje about 14 metres (46 ft) long, located on the north slope of the Ivanščica massif. It is a dry horizontal cave with a wide entrance at the foot of a short cliff. It is sometimes highlighted as the most prominent cave on Ivanščica, and has the most extensive literature of any of its caves. It is difficult to access, but a tourist path has been planned.

== Name ==
Bračkova špilja is not to be confused with Bračkova jama, a nearby pit cave 5.5 metres (18 ft) deep also known as Markova jama na Ivanščici.

== Description ==
The cave is located in the ravine of the Šumec, which cuts through the Dubrava peak. It is horizontal, sloped slightly upwards towards the back, narrower both horizontally and vertically with progression. The inclination was sufficient to prevent the accumulation of sediment on the cave floor The width of the cave near the entrance is about 2–3 metres (6.6–9.8 ft). The entrance is difficult to reach for reasons of inclination.

A map of the cave drawn in 2008 by Hrvoje Cvitanović and colleagues was published in 2012. An older map is kept at the Arhiv Arheološkega odsjeka of the Varaždin City Museum. Continuously updated databases with information on the cave include the Speleological and Biospeleological Cadastre of Varaždin County (Croatian: Speleološki i biospeleološki katastar Županije Varaždinske) begun by Roman Ozimec in 2008, and the national Cadastre of Speleological Objects of the Republic of Croatia (Croatian: Katastar speleoloških objekata Republike Hrvatske). Both are closed to the public but excerpts from the latter are available at Bioportal.

== History ==
Bračkova špilja has long been known to locals. According to a Lepoglava prison guard asked by Stjepan Vuković, who had found an icon of the Mother of God inside the cave in 1947, (Note: For this reason, the Gospodsko pećje mentioned by Hirc and Pihler might be a duplicate of Bračkova špilja.) the Pauline monks at the former monastery had placed the icon there, allegedly to deter visitors from "pagan" practices.

In literature, the cave was first listed by Dragutin Hirc in 1905 among the caves of Zagorje. Subsequent mentions came in 1946, 1961, 1990, 2001, and so on.

The cave was featured and labelled on the 1979 topographic map of scale) 1:5000, and later on the 2003 topographic map.

Long known to be a potential archaeological site, Stjepan Vuković carried out a test dig in 1947. After one of his students discovered of a "Slavic" pottery sherd with a wavy line on the small plateau in front of the cave, Vuković happened on the cave entrance on the 5th of April that year. Their plateau excavations had been carried out during WWII.

The HBSD carried out a new archaeological survey of Bračkova špilja in 2008.

== Climate ==
The air temperature of the cave is 12 °C (54 °F), with a soil temperature of 11.9 °C (53.4 °F). The relative humidity is 94%, and the carbon dioxide concentration 875 ppm at 12.4 °C (54.3 °F).

== Archaeology ==
Like the nearby sites of Mačkova špilja, Vindija, Šincekova špilja, and Veternica, the Bračkova špilja site includes finds from the Late Bronze Age. By the Early Iron Age, the number of inhabited caves in the region had decreased, but still included Bračkova špilja, Mačkova špilja, Vindija, and Veternica. Unlike the Bronze Age, no Iron Age hoards have been found. Some finds in and around the cave have been dated as late as Late Antiquity and the Middle Ages. Being a cave of small dimensions and difficult access. Špoljar assumes that Bračkova špilja was only used as a temporary refuge, despite the excavation of a thick ash layer on the plateau before the cave.

Archaeological remains are kept at the Varaždin City Museum under inventory numbers 1851–1858 and 6391 A–B.

== Biology ==
Pseudoscorpions of the genus Chthonus were found in the cave in the 2008 expedition. A species of cave spider was photographed remains unidentified, as with the Acari, Coleoptera, Staphylinidae, Lepidoptera, and Diptera species also found.

== Tourism ==
A tourist path has been planned from Šumec to Bračkova jama and Bračkova špilja, and from there to Voska luknja and Voska špilja, then to Šumec and Karlova špilja, then to Generalka and Polušpilja Generalski Stol.

== See also ==
- List of caves on Očura

== Bibliography ==
- Hirc, Dragutin (1905a). "Pogled u podzemni svijet domovine: O pećinama u opće" [A View into the Subterranean World of the Homeland: On Caves in General]. Prirodni zemljopis Hrvatske [Natural Geography of Croatia] (in Croatian). pp. 676–683.
- Hirc, Dragutin (1905b). "Pogled u podzemni svijet domovine: Gdje sve ima pećina u našoj domovini" [A View into the Subterranean World of the Homeland: Where All are Caves in Our Homeland]. Prirodni zemljopis Hrvatske [Natural Geography of Croatia] (in Croatian). pp. 683–686.
- Pihler, Lujo (1946). "Ivanščica i Zagorje". Varaždinske vijesti. No. 38–39. ISSN 0042-2711.
- Redenšek, Vladimir (1961). "Popis špilja i ponora u Hrvatskoj (Nastavak)" [List of Caves and Ponors in Croatia (Continuation)] (PDF). Naše planine (in Croatian). No. 5–6. p. 147. ISSN 0354-0650.
- Državna geodetska uprava (1979). Hrvatska osnovna kartau mjerilu 1:5000 (Map). § Ivanec: 5 J 25 - 46.
- Šimek, Marina, ed. (1990). Registar arheoloških nalaza i nalazišta sjeverozapadne Hrvatske [Registry of Archaeological Finds and Sites of Northwest Croatia] (in Croatian) (1st ed.). Varaždin: Muzejsko društvo sjeverozapadne Hrvatske, Sekcija arheologa i preparatora. ISBN 86-81603-01-9.
- Šimek, Marina, ed. (1997). Registar arheoloških nalaza i nalazišta sjeverozapadne Hrvatske [Registry of Archaeological Finds and Sites of Northwest Croatia] (in Croatian) (2nd ed.). Bjelovar: Muzejsko društvo sjeverozapadne Hrvatske, Sekcija arheologa i preparatora. ISBN 953-96880-0-0.
- Poljak, Željko (2001). Hrvatske planine: planinarsko turistički vodič sa 665 fotografija u boji i 50 zemljovida (cjelovit hrvatski planinarski atlas) (3rd ed.). ISBN 953-212-074-2.
- Državna geodetska uprava (2003). Topografska karta 1:25 000 (TK25) (Map) (in Croatian). § Lepoglava: 4616–2–3–1.
- Urednik (2008-06-10). "Počela izrada speleološkog katastra". Zagorje.com.
- Risek, Ljiljana (September 2010). "Prvi jamski sustav na Ivančici dubine preko 50 metara? Poučna staza povezivat će devet špilja i jama na lepoglavskom području" [The First Cave System on Ivančica Deeper than 50 Metres? An Educational Trail will Connect Nine Caves and Pits in the Lepoglava Area] (PDF). Lepoglavski gradski list (in Croatian). Vol. 3, no. 7. p. 14. ISSN 1847-7143.
- Cvitanović, Hrvoje; Ozimec, Roman; Šincek, Dubravko (2012). "Arheološko rekognosciranje u okviru sustavnih speleoloških i biospeleoloških istraživanja: područje sjeverozapadne Hrvatske". Arheologija varaždinskog kraja i srednjeg Podravlja [Archaeological Reconnaissance in the Context of Systematic Speleological and Biospeleological Explorations: The Area of Northwest Croatia]. Izdanja Hrvatskog arheološkog društva (in Croatian). Vol. 28. pp. 21–29. ISBN 978-953-6335-05-3.
- Matišić, Tomica (2012). "Speleološki objekti Ivanščice na području Lepoglave: Dopuna katastra speleoloških objekata Ivanščice" [Speleological Objects of the Lepoglava Area: Supplement to the Cadastre of Speleological Objects of Ivanščica]. Ivanečka škrinjica (in Croatian). 7 (8): 16–45. ISSN 1845-710X.
- Ministarstvo zaštite okoliša i zelene tranzicije Republike Hrvatske (2015–2024). "Katastar speleoloških objekata Republike Hrvatske". Bioportal.
- Speleološka udruga "Kraševski zviri" (2015). "Bračkova špilja". Katastar speleoloških objekata Republike Hrvatske (in Croatian).
- Kraš, Valentina (2017-08-24) [defended 2017-07-13]. Pregled stanja speleoloških objekata u Varaždinskoj županiji [Survey of the State of Speleological Objects in Varaždin County] (Thesis) (in Croatian). Geotehnički fakultet Sveučilišta u Zagrebu.
- Špoljar, Davor (2020-02-27) [defended 2019]. Poselitev severozahodne Hrvaške v času bronaste in starejše železne dobe [Settlers of Northwest Croatia in the Time of the Bronze and Early Iron Ages] (Thesis) (in Croatian). Ljubljana: Filozofska fakulteta.
- Javna ustanova za upravljanje zaštićenim dijelovima prirode Varaždinske županije (2021-04-26). "Na vrhu Ivančice obilježen Dan planeta zemlje" [Earth Day Commemorated on the Peak of Ivančica]. Priroda Varaždinske županije (in Croatian).
