= Voska luknja =

Cave in Croatia

- Location within Croatia
- Interactive map of Voska luknja
- Location: Očura
- Coordinates: 46.184293°N 15.893218°E
- Depth: 22 metres (72 ft)
- Length: 40.7 metres (134 ft)
- Elevation: 509 metres (1,670 ft)
- Discovery: August 2009
- Geology: Karst cave
- Entrances: 2
- Cadastral code: HR00273

Voska luknja is a cave on the north slope of the Ivanščica massif. It is a diagonal cave, so its horizontal length of 25 metres (82 ft) is much smaller than its total passage length of 40.7 metres (134 ft). As mapped, it is the second deepest cave on Ivanščica behind Hanžekova jama at 22 metres (72 ft), but its total vertical difference is the largest in Zagorje, with potential for further expansion. It is difficult to explore because of its narrowness and the entrance is difficult to access, but a tourist path has been planned.

== Name ==
The name Voska luknja is Kajkavian for "Narrow Hole" (Croatian: Uska rupa).

== Description ==
The cave is located on the slopes of the Dubrava peak. It is an exceptionally narrow cave, partly tectonic in origin, whose widest section is only 70 centimetres (2.3 ft) wide. It is a cascading cave entered from the side with continuations both at the top and at the bottom for a total known vertical difference so far of 38.2 metres (125 ft), but these narrows are impassable without modification. The main chamber leads upwards and goes by the name Veliki kanal. The chamber leading downwards has been nicknamed Banana, ending on a ledge with a narrow continuation. At the far end of the floor of the Veliki kanal there is a narrow downward continuation nicknamed Cerviks, and at the roof there are as many as 4 possible continuations, all very narrow.

Speleothems include stalactites, stalagmites, and coralloids, but flowstone dominates, including Cave curtains. A cluster of calcite crystals was found contrasting with brown hematite coloration at a depth of 25 metres (82 ft) below the entrance.

A map of the cave was drawn in September 2009 by Tomica Matišić.

== History ==
Cavers from the newly founded HSS section Kraševski Zviri discovered both the lower and the upper entrance in August 2009, exploring much of the lower entrance that year. Exploration resumed in June 2010, adding another 10 metres (33 ft) downward. It was during this exploration that Voska špilja was discovered not far above it. Its regionally unusual depth (initially 30 metres (98 ft)), proximity to Voska špilja and the potential for a connection to result in a cave with a cumulative depth of around 50 metres (160 ft), unusual for the region, made it an attractive target for exploration and garnered significant media attention, and before the discovery of Gliboka jama was sometimes regarded as the deepest cave in Zagorje. In July 2011, the widening of the upper passage with a rock chisel increased its explored length by 8 metres (26 ft), with ultimate the aim of connecting it to Voska špilja. Fox bones hinted at a buried intermediary entrance, but they were still far away from Voska špilja.

== Paleontology ==
A Cervus elaphus antler was discovered in one of the meanders, possibly brought there during a flooding episode, along with Vulpes vulpes bones in a blind passage of the upper section near a buried upper entrance.

== Climate ==
The air temperature of the cave is 10.7 °C (51.3 °F), and its soil temperature is 10.2 °C (50.4 °F). Its relative humidity is 98%. Its radon concentration was measured in 2012–2013.

The cave is not hydrologically active. Seepage dominates in the lower levels.

== Biology ==
Species found in the cave include members of the Araneae, Coleoptera, Gastropoda, and Lepidoptera. A Rhinolophus species was identified.

== Tourism ==
A tourist path has been planned from Šumec to Bračkova jama and Bračkova špilja, and from there to Voska luknja and Voska špilja, then to Šumec and Karlova špilja, then to Generalka and Polušpilja Generalski Stol.

== See also ==
- List of caves on Očura

== Bibliography ==
- Risek, Ljiljana (September 2010). "Prvi jamski sustav na Ivančici dubine preko 50 metara? Poučna staza povezivat će devet špilja i jama na lepoglavskom području" [The First Cave System on Ivančica Deeper than 50 Metres? An Educational Trail will Connect Nine Caves and Pits in the Lepoglava Area] (PDF). Lepoglavski gradski list (in Croatian). Vol. 3, no. 7. p. 14. ISSN 1847-7143.
- Risek, Ljiljana (2011-08-09). "Voska luknja po svojim je dimenzijama najveći poznati speleološki objekt na planini Ivančici; speleolozima je intrigantna jer još uvijek joj ne znaju veličinu" [Voska Luknja is by its Dimensions the Largest Known Speleological Object on Mount Ivančica; It is Intriguing to Speleologists Because They Still Do Not Know Its Size]. Večernji list (in Croatian). eISSN 1333-9222.
- Matišić, Tomica (2012). "Speleološki objekti Ivanščice na području Lepoglave: Dopuna katastra speleoloških objekata Ivanščice" [Speleological Objects of the Lepoglava Area: Supplement to the Cadastre of Speleological Objects of Ivanščica]. Ivanečka škrinjica (in Croatian). 7 (8): 16–45. ISSN 1845-710X.
- Regionalni Tjednik (2013-02-14). "Utječe li radon na učestalost raka pluća u ivanečkom kraju?" [Does Radon Influence the Incidence of Lung Cancer in Ivanec Region?]. 7Plus (in Croatian). No. 456. eISSN 1846-2960.
- Matišić, Tomica; Ozimec, Roman (2014). "Speleološki objekti Ivanščice – primjer katastra supradinarika Hrvatske". Skup speleologa Hrvatske, lepoglava 21.-23. studeni 2014 [Speleological Objects of Ivanščica - An Example Cadastre of the Supradinarides of Croatia] (PDF) (in Croatian). Speleološka udruga Kraševski zviri. pp. 14–15. ISBN 978-953-58320-0-3.
- Speleološka udruga "Kraševski zviri" (2015). "Voska luknja". Katastar speleoloških objekata Republike Hrvatske (in Croatian).
- Kraš, Valentina (2017-08-24) [defended 2017-07-13]. Pregled stanja speleoloških objekata u Varaždinskoj županiji [Survey of the State of Speleological Objects in Varaždin County] (Thesis) (in Croatian). Geotehnički fakultet Sveučilišta u Zagrebu.
- eVaraždin (2018-11-06). "Jeste li znali? Varaždinska županija krije pravo bogatstvo špilja i jama - pogledajte ljepotu svih do sada otkrivenih" [Did You Know? Varaždin County Hides A True Wealth of Caves and Pits - See the Beauty of all Discovered So Far]. eVaraždin (in Croatian).
- VŽ (2023-10-06). "Podzemno bogatstvo: prije mjesec dana otkrivena najdublja jama u Varaždinskoj županiji" [Subterranean Wealth: A Month Ago the Deepest Cave in Varaždin County Was Discovered]. Varaždinska županija (in Croatian).
- prigorski.hr (2023-10-06). "Podzemno bogatstvo: Prije mjesec dana otkrivena najdublja jama u Varaždinskoj županiji" [How Beautiful is Zagorje the Green - and Deep: Speleologists Discovered the Deepest Cave in Zagorje by Ivanec]. Prigorski (in Croatian).
- Blotnej, Bogdan (2023-10-21). "Lepe ti je Zagorje zelene - i duboke: Speleolozi kraj Ivanca otkrili najdublju zagorsku jamu!" [How Beautiful is Zagorje the Green - and Deep: Speleologists Discovered the Deepest Cave in Zagorje by Ivanec]. 24sata (in Croatian). eISSN 2303-7628.
