= List of caves on Očura =

Many of the caves of the Očura massif, including Ivanščica and Strahinjčica, were listed by Vladimir Redenšek in 1961. Work on the speleological cadastre of Ivanščica began in 2008, an early version being presented in 2009. The last full version was finished in 2011 titled Speleološki i biospeleološki katastar Ivanščice, and since then updates have only been made to local and national cadastres.

Names	Depth	Length	State	Number	Elevation	Coordinates	Sources
Belecgradska špilja	0	11.8		HR03293		46.16°N 16.11°E	
Bjelička špilja	0	13.7		HR03628		46.15°N 16.13°E	
Bjelička špilja 2							
Bračkova špilja (Note: Bračkova pečina, Bračkova peć)	0	14		HR01847	350	46.19738°N 16.03328°E	(Note: Bračkova špilja bibliography)
Brana špilja	5	?		HR02133		46.16°N 16.11°E	
Brana špilja 2	2	?		HR02135		46.16°N 16.11°E	
Brana 3	0.4	6.4		HR04379		46.16°N 16.11°E	
Bučva	0	12.2		HR04389		46.15°N 16.06°E	
Ceprka	0	5.5		HR02883		46.189°N 16.081°E	
Cincilator	3	21.9		HR02239		46.167609°N 16.04507°E	
Cingulica pod Židovinom	0	13.5		HR01842		46.17049°N 16.14086°E	(Note: ˙˙˙˙˙˙˙)
Cuhik		7.9					
Cukovčica	3.3	7.4		HR02475		46.15°N 16.06°E	
Čavljerica						(Note: At the bottom of the canyon of the Selnica stream.)	
Črna luknja	0	7.1		HR03562		46.17°N 16.09°E	
Djedak	0	6.1		HR04301		46.16°N 16.10°E	
Drenovec (Note: Špilja kod Milengrada)	5.9	6.2	(Note: "U cilju zaštite speleoloških objekata ili njihovih dijelova od Ministarstva je potrebno ishoditi dopuštenje za posjećivanje, korištenje ili uređenje speleološkog objekta ili njegovoga dijela." [In order to protect speleological objects or their parts, it is necessary to seek a permit from the Ministry for the visiting of, use of or arrangement of a speleological object or its part.])	HR04309		46.16°N 16.17°E	
Dupljača	0	16.7		HR03550		46.16°N 16.14°E	(Note: ˙˙˙˙˙˙)
Ermitage	0	5.1		HR00756		46.16°N 16.10°E	
Generalka	5	?	Danger! Explosive waste.	HR00287	623	46.19644°N 16.05184°E	
Gnjusna jama	16	39	Caving certification required. Danger! Explosive waste.	HR00198		46.19835°N 15.92079°E	
Gornjopokojčica	2.8	10.7		HR03201		46.16°N 16.03°E	
Gospodsko pećje							
Hamčica	1.7	6.5		HR04212		46.18°N 16.21°E	
Hamište (Note: Skrovište)						(Note: Ivanščica)	
Hanžekica	18.8	41	Caving certification required.	HR00309		46.16°N 16.13°E	
Hanžekova jama	25.5	25.5	Caving certification required.	HR02117	405	46.16502321°N 16.12219175°E	(Note: ˙˙˙˙˙˙˙˙)
Iglu	0.5	8		HR02884		46.19°N 16.09°E	
Inženjerka (Note: Inžinjerka)	2.7	29		HR03459		46.16°N 16.14°E	
Ivijeva jama (Note: Ivina jama, Plantakova jama)	9	?	Caving certification required.	HR01864		46.19096°N 16.22688°E	
Jagnjedovečka špilja							
Jama ispod Belec grada	8.1	?	Caving certification required.	HR01861		46.16°N 16.11°E	(Note: ˙)
Jama Kujsnica	3.9	5.1		HR01007		46.19439°N 16.17329°E	
Jama pod bregom	<10		Caving certification required.				
Jama pod Gradinovcem	5.2		Caving certification required.				
Japančeva špilja						(Note: Ivanščica)	
Karlova špilja	0	8.5	Danger! Biowaste.	HR00306	556	46.1936°N 16.0321°E	
Kikačova jama	9	?		HR00745		46.17°N 16.16°E	
Kikačova špilja	3.4	5.3	Danger! Biowaste.	HR00746		46.17°N 16.16°E	
Kolinci						(Note: Ivanščica)	
Košenička špilja						(Note: Ivanščica)	
Košenička špilja 2						(Note: Ivanščica)	
Križnjak						(Note: Ivanščica)	
Let dvije sove	0.8	5.1		HR04140		46.19084°N 16.20725°E	
Loparićeva peć (Note: Loparičeva peć)							
Mačji kamen							
Majpeć						46.159°N 16.076°E	
Malopećinska špilja	0	5.4		HR03773		46.19721°N 16.0545°E	
Markova jama (Note: Bračkova jama)	5	?		HR00311		46.19658°N 16.03411°E	
Mastinka	0	6.1		HR04293		46.21019°N 16.18889°E	
Matekova špilja 1	0	10		HR01862		46.18947°N 16.12614°E	
Matekova špilja 2	0	14		HR01862		46.18947°N 16.12614°E	
Nada za Siljevec	0	5.1		HR04423		46.1878°N 16.18763°E (Note: Veliki Siljevec)	
Ober krila	0	5.2		HR04161		46.2164°N 16.19696°E	
Osinec jama	5.5	?	Caving certification required.	HR01827		46.16°N 16.11°E	(Note: ˙˙˙)
Osredek	0	6.5		HR03198		46.18903°N 16.02826°E	(Note: ˙˙˙˙)
Padavica	2	5.9		HR03292		46.15°N 16.06°E	(Note: ˙˙)
Pavlova hiža (Note: Pavlova špilja, Špilja u Loboru kod Loborgrada)	0	?		HR02131		46.15519°N 16.07186°E	(Note: ˙˙˙˙˙˙)
Peta špilja	3.9	7.5		HR03200		46.16°N 16.03°E	(Note: ˙˙)
Podrapuša	0	6		HR02882		46.189°N 16.081°E	
Poklon	0	5.2		HR00256		46.15°N 16.06°E	(Note: ˙)
Poklončić	0	5.9		HR03199		46.15°N 16.06°E	(Note: ˙˙)
Polušpilja Generalski stol	0	5.2		HR00747		46.19721°N 16.0545°E	(Note: ˙˙˙)
Ponor pod Starim gradom	11					46.165°N 15.870°E	
Povuci-potegni							
Ranogajka						46.198°N 15.920°E	
Rasjed kod Milengrada							
Raskopana špilja	0	5.2		HR03742		46.15°N 16.13°E	(Note: ˙˙˙)
Rupa iznad Bračkove špilje	0	5.2		(Note: "X 5581505, Y 5117441")	485		
Siktajuća špilja							
Skliska polušpilja	3						
Stanovnik špilja			Buried.				
Sutinščica (Note: Ponor Sutinščica, Sutinska pećina, Peć nad Sutinskom, Pećina kod Sutinskih toplica sa dva otvora)	5.5	254	Caving certification required. Danger! High CO₂ concentration.	HR03513		46.11366°N 16.01523°E	(Note: Sutinščica bibliography)
Sveta Lucija	0	24		HR00734		46.19°N 16.09°E	(Note: ˙˙)
Špičasta špilja	2.97	5.2		HR03783		46.16°N 16.14°E	(Note: ˙)
Špilja ispod Majera		6.4		HR04147		46.16°N 16.09°E	
Špilja iznad Cincilatora	4.1	19.6		HR03202		46.16°N 16.03°E	(Note: ˙˙)
Špilja iznad vodovoda	0	8.7		HR02240		46.17°N 16.04°E	(Note: ˙)
Špilja kod Mržnjaka	2.9	8.3		HR03202		46.16°N 16.03°E	(Note: ˙˙)
Špilja kod Vražjeg stolčeka						(Note: Ivanščica)	
Špilja na Pisanoj pečini	1	7.8		HR01829		46.16°N 16.22°E	(Note: ˙)
Špilja pod bregom	0	5.7		HR00751		46.19922°N 16.00552°E	(Note: ˙˙)
Špilja pod jelovinom	2.5	5.3					
Špilja pod Starim gradom I						46.165°N 15.870°E	
Špilja pod Starim gradom II						46.165°N 15.870°E	
Špilja Selnica		9.4					
Špilja u Bukevju (Note: Špilja pod Babinom goricom)	0	10		HR01846		46.20528°N 16.14506°E	(Note: ˙˙)
Špilja u dvorištu Florijana Alberta						(Note: Unska ulica br. 12, Krapina)	
Špilja u Severovom kamenolomu			Damaged or destroyed.				(Note: ˙)
Špilja zapadno od Babinog zuba 1							
Špilja zapadno od Babinog zuba 2							
Špiljnica		5.8					
Šumec	0	6		HR00310	479	46.1985°N 16.0327°E	(Note: ˙˙˙)
Temenka	1	6.5		HR03197		46.190°N 16.057°E	(Note: ˙˙˙)
Trokatnica (Note: Modra špilja)	0	8.3		HR04290		46.17°N 16.15°E	(Note: ˙˙˙)
Udo vuska						46.188°N 15.864°E	
Velika špilja na Rudskom gubcu	4	?		HR01848		46.170051°N 16.239866°E	(Note: ˙˙)
Vilica						46.188°N 15.864°E	
Vilina jama pod Zelenim pećinom (Note: Vilinska jama, Vilenska jama, Volina jama, Volinjska jama)	7	21	Caving certification required.	HR00834		46.18808°N 15.864862°E	(Note: ˙˙˙˙˙˙˙˙)
Vilinska jama	5.8	14.9	Caving certification required.	HR02473		46.16°N 16.03°E	
Volarščica	0	7		HR01858		46.184293°N 15.893218°E	(Note: ˙)
Voska luknja	22 (Note: 38.2)	40.7	Caving certification required. Danger! Biowaste.	HR00273	509	46.19451°N 16.0254°E	(Note: Voska luknja bibliography)
Voska špilja	0	7.4	Danger! Biowaste.	HR00308	623	46.19283°N 16.02809°E	(Note: ˙˙˙˙)
Vranja jama (Note: Rana peć, Vrana peć)	12.5	15.5	Caving certification required.	HR02143		46.20164°N 15.88483°E	(Note: ˙˙˙˙)
Vuglovščak (Note: Medveđa pećiniya)	0	12.5	Danger! Biowaste.	HR00744		46.20°N 16.09°E	(Note: ˙)
Vularna	0	15		HR01841		46.19075°N 16.20413°E	(Note: ˙˙˙)

== See also ==
- List of Dinaric caves

== Notes ==
=== Legend ===
Dry cave (Note: Rarely flooded.)	Partly wet cave (Note: At least one entrance dry but at least one passage with flowing water.)	Wet cave (Note: At least one entrance rarely dry.)	Submerged cave (Note: Rarely exposed.)	Cave with complex hydrological regime (Note: For example with seasonal variation.)
