= Sutinščica =

Cave in Croatia

- Ponor Sutinščica, Sutinska pećina, Peć nad Sutinskom, Pećina kod Sutinskih toplica sa dva otvora
- Location within Croatia
- Interactive map of Sutinščica
- Location: Mače
- Coordinates: 46.11366°N 16.01523°E
- Depth: 5.5 metres (18 ft)
- Length: 254 metres (0.158 mi)
- Discovery: 2021 (to science)
- Geology: Karst cave
- Entrances: 1
- Cadastral code: HR03513

Sutinščica is the longest cave in Zagorje with 254 metres (0.158 mi) of explored passage, and is located in the southern foothills of the Ivanščica massif. Its depth is 5.5 metres (18 ft), but its total vertical difference is 13.5 metres (44 ft). It is a mostly horizontal cave, so its horizontal length of 229 metres (751 ft) is close to its total length. Part of the cave is seasonally dry, while part requires specialised equipment. The opening keyhole passage opens up into a series of chambers, while the permanently submerged section further back remains unexplored.

== Description ==
Sutinščica is a ponor of average width 1 metre (3.3 ft) and height 1.5 metres (4.9 ft) along northward orientation from the entrance. The keyhole shape of this passage originated as the result of differential erosion between high and low water levels. Speleothems are present in the cave, but many have likely been destroyed by undocumented explorers. In wetter conditions, only 105 metres (344 ft) are explorable without diving equipment thanks to a siphon.

120 metres (390 ft) from the entrance there is a sequence of two larger chambers, of dimensions 10×10×6 m and 13×9×4 m (length×width×height). Reaching these chambers is difficult because of narrow, muddy passages, the narrowest passage in the cave being the 0.35 metres (1.1 ft) squeeze just before the entrance to the second chamber. Even at low water level, the cave typically ends in a small siphon, though its water level gradually lowers.

A map of the cave as explored in 2021 has been published.

== History ==
A cave "with two entrances" near Sutinske Toplice was first mentioned in 1889. This information was relayed by Dragutin Hirc in 1905. This information was repeated by Vladimir Redenšek in 1961 and by Roman Ozimec in 2011. It may or may not be the same as Sutinščica, but it is argued to be a strong possibility, and the search for that cave in 2021 is the reason the Sutinščica was discovered.

Cavers from the HSS section Kraševski Zviri first learned of the entrance to a spring cave in Mali Komor from local resident Božo Cerčić in January 2021, who told them that only miners had dared to enter it in the past. Sediment that had accumulated at the entrance had to be removed before it could be explored. The initial length explored on 14 February was 105 metres (344 ft), with no further exploration beyond the first siphon. It was already longer than Židovske jame, until that point the longest cave in Zagorje. The cavers returned on the 21st when conditions were drier, discovering about 50–100 metres (160–330 ft) of new passageway, including two chambers. Topographic mapping continued on the 25th and 26th, with a new cumulative length of 205 metres (673 ft). This was followed by a photography expedition on 2 March. After the water level fell further, an expedition on the 11th was able to map the cave to 236 metres (774 ft), with little further activity carried out that year apart from a public presentation on the exploration of the cave.

The main reason for abandoning further cave exploration in late 2021 and early 2022 was because in September 2021, a carbon dioxide concentration of 4% with oxygen at 17% was measured. Only after a second measurement in February 2022 showed a concentration in equilibrium with ambient levels could exploration resume, so on the 2nd a team entered the cave, mapping it to 254 metres (833 ft) thanks to a side passage connection previously not noticed.

An attempt to find a second entrance in 2023 was unsuccessful, although it did clean the area around the cave of a significant amount of waste. The water level did not permit significant further exploration that year.

== Biology ==
Stygofauna include isopods. The presence of etiolated seedlings of some plant species within the cave was also noted. A biospeleological expedition was carried out in 2023.

== See also ==
- List of caves on Očura

== Bibliography ==
- Hirc, Dragutin (1905). "Zagorje". Prirodni zemljopis Hrvatske [Natural Geography of Croatia] (in Croatian). pp. 134–171.
- Redenšek, Vladimir (1961). "Popis špilja i ponora u Hrvatskoj (Nastavak)" [List of Caves and Ponors in Croatia (Continuation)] (PDF). Naše planine (in Croatian). No. 5–6. p. 147. ISSN 0354-0650.
- Ozimec, Roman; Šincek, Dubravko (2011-06-14). "Speleološki objekti planinskih masiva SZ Hrvatske" [Speleological Objects of the Mountain Massifs of NW Croatia]. Radovi Zavoda za znanstveni rad Varaždin (in Croatian) (22): 201–232. eISSN 1848-7890.
- Dubovečak, Vinka (2021). "Rekognosciranje 2021/22" [Reconnaissance 2021/22]. Speleološka udruga "Kraševski zviri" (in Croatian).
- Dubovečak, Vinka (2021a). "Hrvatsko zagorje dobilo novu najdulju špilju – Sutinščicu!" [Croatian Zagorje Got a New Longest Cave - Sutinščica!]. Speleološka udruga Kraševski zviri (in Croatian).
- Dubovečak, Vinka (2021b). "Istraživanje Sutinščice – dio 2" [Exploration of Sutinščica - Part 2]. Speleološka udruga Kraševski zviri (in Croatian).
- Dubovečak, Vinka (2021c). "Pronađena nova najdulja špilja u Hrvatskom zagorju- Sutinščica!" [New Longest Cave in Croatian Zagorje Discovered- Sutinščica!]. Zagorje Priroda (in Croatian).
- Dubovečak, Vinka (2021d). "Nastavak istraživanja špilje Sutinščice u Malom Komoru (Mače)" [Continuation of the Exploration of the Sutinščica Cave in Mali Komor (Mače)]. Speleološka udruga "Kraševski zviri" (in Croatian).
- Benko, Iva (2021-06-05). "Hanžekova jama: Upoznavanje novih speleologa pripravnika s prirodnim bogatstvima našeg kraja". Sjeverni.info (in Croatian).
- ZI (2021-10-14). "Doznajte sve o istraživanjima Sutinščice, najveće špilje Hrvatskog zagorja" [Learn All about the Explorations of Sutinščica, the Longest Cave of Croatian Zagorje]. Zagorje International (in Croatian).
- Dubovečak, Vinka (2022-04-19). "Nova duljina špiljskih kanala Sutinščice iznosi 254 m!" [The New Length of Cave Passages of Sutinščica Totals 254 m!]. Speleološka udruga "Kraševski zviri" (in Croatian).
- Androić, Damir (2022). "Sutinščica". VZ Aktualno. Archived from the original on 2025-05-02.
- Speleološka udruga "Kraševski zviri" (2022). "Sutinščica". Katastar speleoloških objekata Republike Hrvatske.
- Kraš, Valentina (2023-10-07). "Čišćenje ponora Sutinščice" [Cleaning the Ponor Sutinščica]. Speleološka udruga "Kraševski zviri" (in Croatian).
- Novak, Ruđer (2023a). "Ponor Sutinščica" [The Ponor Sutinščica]. Čisto podzemlje (in Croatian).
- Novak, Ruđer (2023b). "Akcija čišćenja ponora Sutinščice" [Activity of Cleaning the Ponor Sutinščica]. Čisto podzemlje (in Croatian).
- Kuharić, Nikolina (2023-06-23). "Zagorje zelene 2023" [Zagorje of Green 2023]. Hrvatsko biospeleološko društvo (in Croatian).
- Androić, Damir (2024-02-06). "Monitorig Sutinščice 28.12.2023" [Monitoring Sutinščica 28.12.2023]. Speleološka udruga "Kraševski zviri" (in Croatian).
- Speleološka udruga "Kraševski zviri" (2025-01-31). "Informativno-edukativni video o špilji Sutinščici" [Informative-Educational Video on the Cave Sutinščica]. Općina Mače (in Croatian). Embedded video on YouTube.
