= Bednja =

Bednja may refer to:

- Bednja, Varaždin County, a village and municipality in northern Croatia
- Bednja (river), a river in northern Croatia
