= Veliki Bukovec =

Veliki Bukovec may refer to:

- Veliki Bukovec, Varaždin County, a village and a municipality in Croatia
- Veliki Bukovec, Krapina-Zagorje County, a village near Mače, Croatia
