= Coralloid =

Coralloid (coral-shaped) may refer to:

- Cave popcorn, small nodes of calcite, aragonite or gypsum that form on surfaces in caves
- Coral shaped forms in plants such as roots of cycads
