= Donja Višnjica =

- Village
- Interactive map of Donja Višnjica
- Coordinates: 46.293°N 16.007°E
- Country: Croatia
- County: Varaždin County
- Town: Lepoglava

Area
  - Total: 5.1 km^{2} (2.0 sq mi)

Population (2021)
  - Total: 511
  - Density: 100/km^{2} (260/sq mi)
- Time zone: UTC+1 (CET)
  - Summer (DST): UTC+2 (CEST)
- 42250 Lepoglava: +385 (0)42

Donja Višnjica is a village of the town of Lepoglava, Varaždin County, in northern Croatia.

== Demographics ==
Village of Donja Višnjica: Population trends 1857–2011
v

population	475	500	559	643	622	640	700	705	794	755	663	627	684	614	549	542
	1857	1869	1880	1890	1900	1910	1921	1931	1948	1953	1961	1971	1981	1991	2001	2011

Sources: Croatian Bureau of Statistics publications

== Bibliography ==
- Repanić-Braun, Mirjana (2012-12-28). "Prilog istraživanju baroknog slikarstva u Hrvatskoj − zidne slike u Višnjici i Koprivničkom Ivancu". Radovi Instituta za povijest umjetnosti (in Serbo-Croatian). 36: 141–152. eISSN 1845-4534.
- Jagić, Suzana (2009-11-10). "Povijesne okolnosti osnutka pučkih škola u Višnjici, Ivancu, Maruševcu i Bednji 1839. godine" [The Historical Circumstances Surrounding the Foundation of Elementary Schools in Višnjica, Maruševec and Bednja in the Year 1839]. Kaj: časopis za književnost, umjetnost, kulturu (in Croatian). 42 (4–5): 115–126. eISSN 1848-7920.
