= Ivan Ranger =

Austrian painter

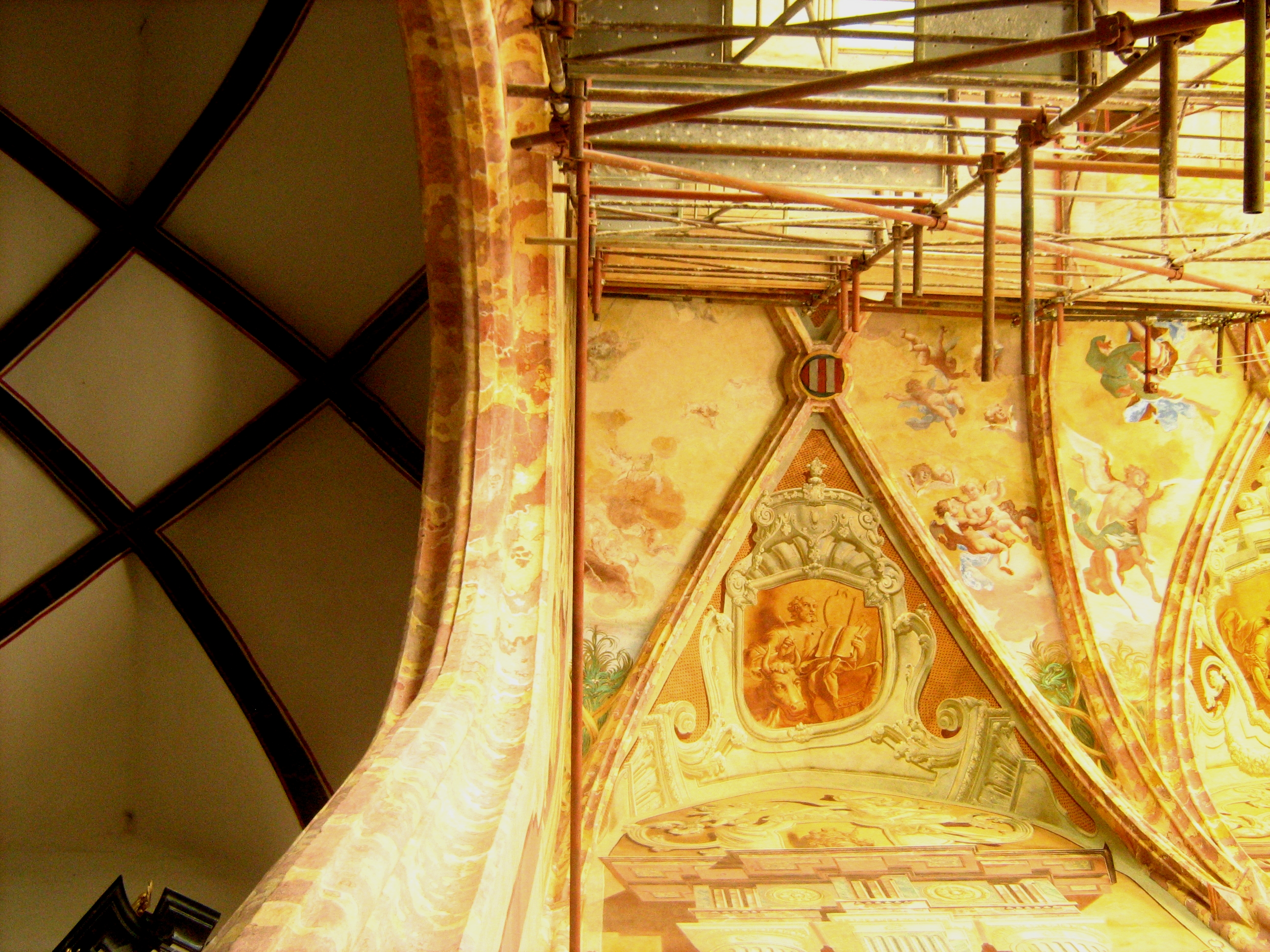
Gothic vaulting in the parish church in Lepoglava. To the left is the original Gothic vaulting. To the right is the sanctuary vault painted in Baroque style by Ivan Ranger

Johann Baptist Ranger (Croatian: Ivan Krstitelj Ranger, Slovene: Janez Krstnik Ranger; 1700–1753) was a Tyrolese baroque painter.

== Career ==
Ranger was born in Tyrol. He entered the Pauline monastic order as a child. He started to paint very early in its artistic workshops in northern Italy and southern Germany. Because the Paulist order paid particular attention to artistic and cultural activities within the order, he remained in Croatia from his twenties until his death at Lepoglava, decorating sacral interiors and producing one of the most remarkable Baroque opuses of Central European mural painting.

His paintings were stylistically original compositions. Ranger produced most of his opus in churches, chapels, and monasteries, such as in the churches of Assumption of Mary's in Remete near Zagreb, in Lepoglava, in St. George's in Purga, near Lepoglava, St. Helen's chapel in Šenkovec near Čakovec, also the church of St. Jerome in nearby hilly Štrigova. The church of St. Jerome was the central site of the Order of Saint Paul the Hermit until the year 1786, when the order was abolished, causing the monasteries, churches and other premises to suffer great devastation. The order's treasures, such as books and other valuables, were scattered or destroyed, its activities left to be lost in time.

Ranger's frescoes were preserved on arched ceilings and walls over the 250 years since their creation. Ranger had enormous importance and influence upon his disciples and followers in the many works painted later. These characteristics are the illusionist painting of architecture, the recognizable typology of saints' figures, the colourist features and the incorporation of large compositions onto the relatively small and low walls of the churches. The Pauline order painting school of workshop continued in that way its activity in north-western Croatia long after Ranger's time.
