= Veliki Bukovec, Krapina-Zagorje County =

Veliki Bukovec
- Village
- Interactive map of Veliki Bukovec
- Location within Krapina-Zagorje County Location within Croatia
- Coordinates: 46°05′02″N 16°01′19″E
- Country: Croatia
- County: Krapina-Zagorje County
- Municipality: Mače

Area
  - Total: 1.8 sq mi (4.7 km^{2})

Population (2021)
  - Total: 292
  - Density: 160/sq mi (62/km^{2})
- Time zone: UTC+1 (CET)
  - Summer (DST): UTC+2 (CEST)

Veliki Bukovec is a village near Mače in northern Croatia.
