= Ivanščica =

Mountain in northern Croatia

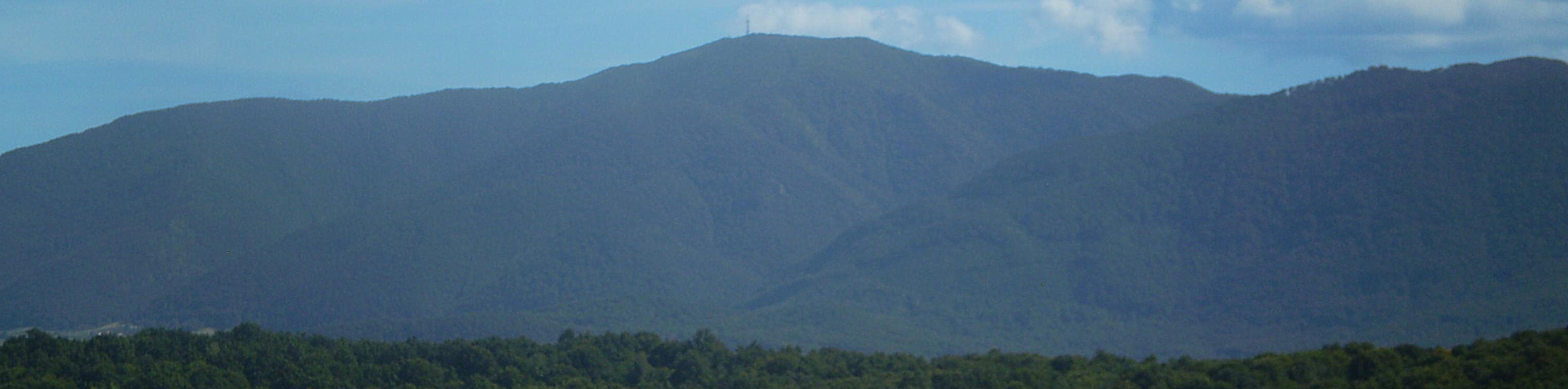

Highest point
- Elevation: 1,059 m (3,474 ft)
- Coordinates: 46°10′32″N 16°06′21″E

Geography
- Location within Croatia
- Location: Croatia

Ivanščica (pronounced [iʋǎnʃʈ͡ʂit͡sa]) or Ivančica is a mountain in northern Croatia. The highest peak is the eponymous Ivanščica at 1,059 metres (3,474 ft). Together with Strahinjščica it forms the Očura massif.

The rivers of Bednja, Lonja, Krapina and Veliki potok rise and flow in the area.

On March 16, 1983, at 13:52:52, Ivanščica was the epicenter of a very strong (MCS VII) earthquake.

== Name ==
Ivanjščica is the Kajkavian form of the name, while Ivančica is the Shtokavized form.

== Speleology ==
Ivanščica is a partly karst massif, and a number of caves have formed in those layers, such as Bračkova špilja, Voska luknja, Karlova špilja and Generalka on its northern slopes, or Sutinščica in its southern foothills.

== Mountain huts ==
In the 1935–1936 season, the Pasarićeva kuća mountain hut, at 1,061 metres (3,481 ft) in elevation, saw 1025 visitors. In the 1936–1937 season, it saw 510 visitors, including 7 Austrian citizens. In the 1937–1938 season it saw 586 visitors, including 2 Austrian citizens.

== Gallery ==
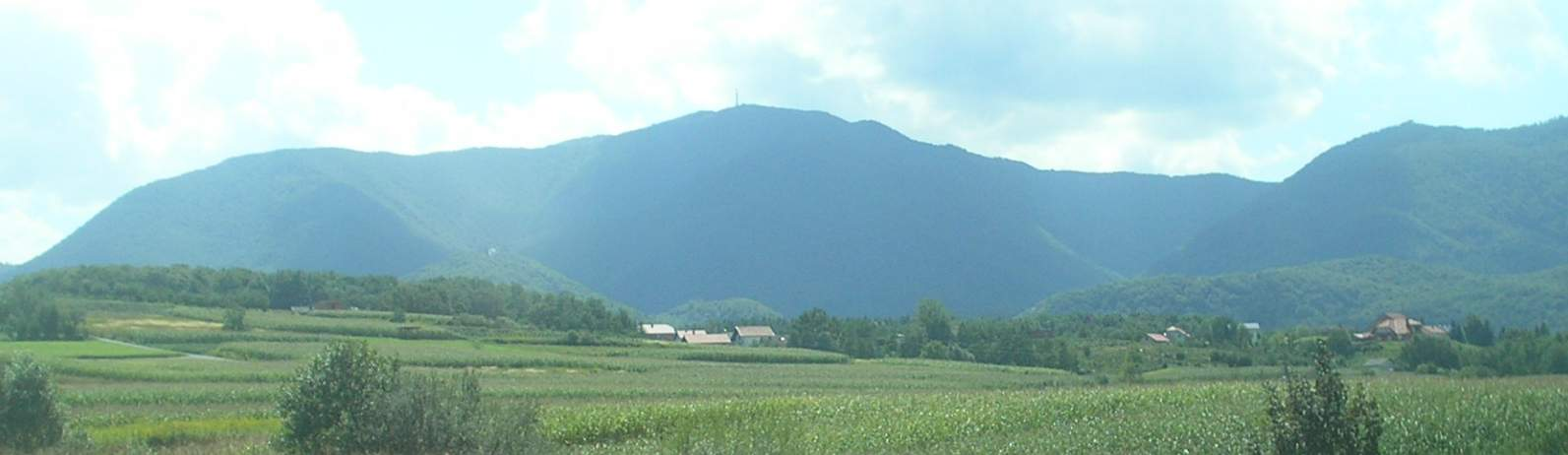
Ivanščica from the north

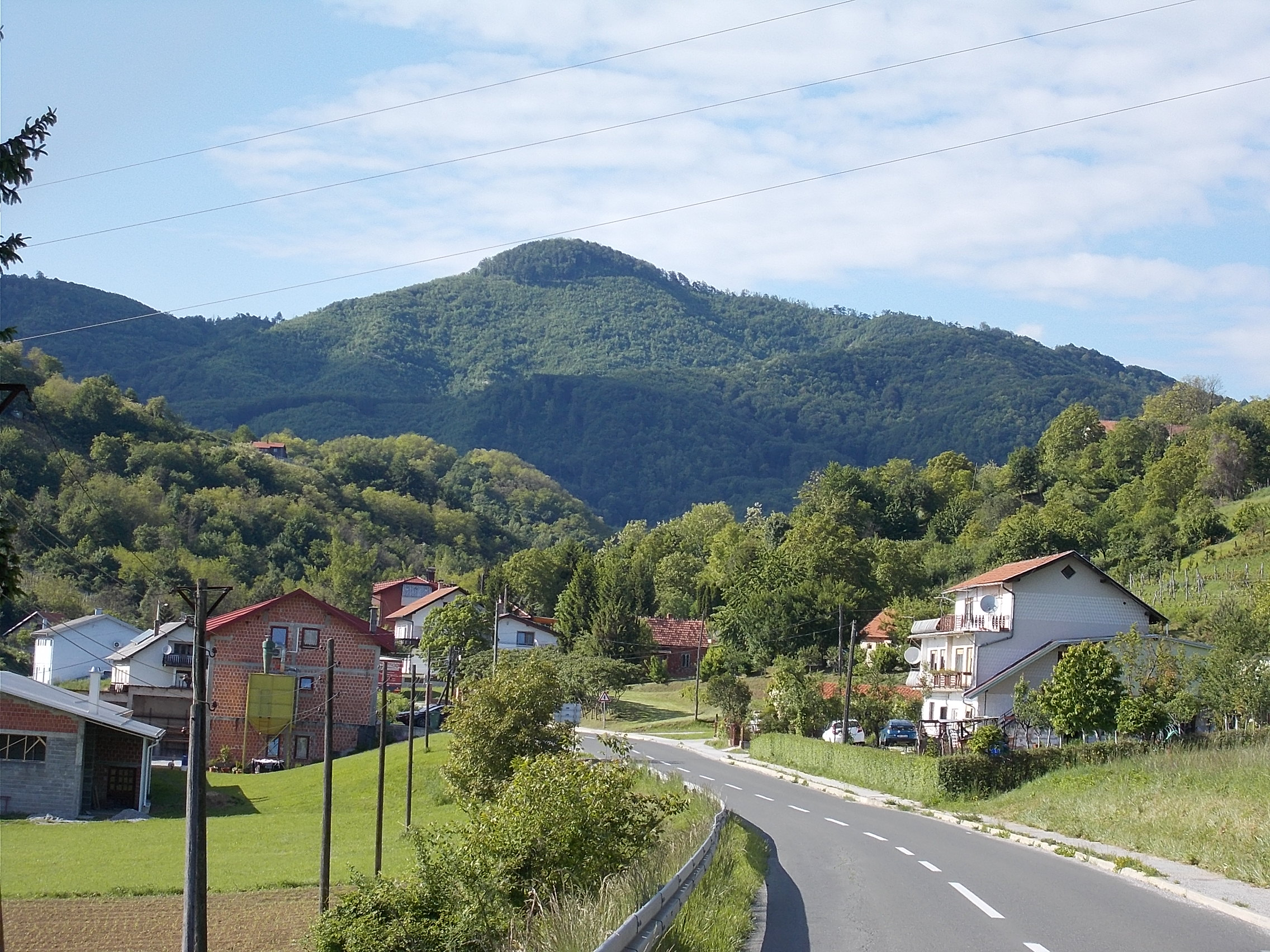
Ivanščica from Lobor

== Bibliography ==
=== Alpinism ===
- Poljak, Željko (February 1959). "Ivančica". Kazalo za "Hrvatski planinar" i "Naše planine" 1898—1958 (PDF). Naše planine. Vol. XI. p. 5. ISSN 0354-0650.

=== Botany ===
- Mužik, Ana; Špoljarić Maronić, Dubravka; Žuna Pfeiffer, Tanja; Katanić, Zorana; Kadoić, Jelena; Šag, Matej; Krstin, Ljiljana (2023). "Floristička raznolikost područja Ivanščice". Zbornik sažetaka 12. Simpozija s međunarodnim sudjelovanjem Kopački rit - jučer, danas, sutra 2023 (PDF). Vol. 12. pp. 158–159. ISSN 1849-8264.
- Ernoić, Milenko; Vincek, Dragutin (2022-12-28). "Agrobiološka raznolikost na širem području Parka prirode Ivanščica, Strahinjščica, Maceljska i Ravna gora u funkciji održivosti parka prirode i ruralnog razvoja" [Agricultural Biodiversity in the Wider Area of the Nature Park in the Function of the Nature Park Sustainability and Rural Development]. Radovi Zavoda za znanstveni rad Varaždin (in Croatian) (33): 169–178. doi:10.21857/m16wjcn7x9. ISSN 1848-7890.
- Borovečki-Voska, Ljiljana; Šincek, Dubravko (2014). "Istraživanje biljnih zajednica brdskih travnjaka na južnim padinama Ivanščice" [Exploration of plant communities of hill meadows on the southern flanks of Ivanščica]. ResearchGate (in Croatian).
- Schlosser Klekovski, Josip Klasancije; Vukotinović, Ljudevit Farkaš (1854). "Naturhistorische Wanderungen durch einige Gegenden Nord-Croatiens im Jahr 1853" [Natural History Hikes Through Some Parts of North Croatia in the Year 1853]. Österreichisches Botanische Wochenblatt (in German). 4 (17): 137–141. ISSN 1029-0729. JSTOR 43793026.

=== Geology ===
- Sabolek, Jura (2023-12-04) [defended 2023-09-18]. Geomorfološka obilježja i vrednovanje georaznolikosti Ivančice [Geomorphological characteristics and geodiversity evaluation of Ivančica] (Thesis) (in Serbo-Croatian). Zagreb: Prirodoslovno-matematički fakultet Sveučilišta u Zagrebu.
- Lozić, Sanja; Fuerst-Bjeliš, Borna; Perica, Dražen (2006-06-01). "Quantitative-geomorphological and Environmental-historical Impact of the Ecological Soil Depth; Northwestern Croatia". Hrvatski geografski glasnik. 68 (1): 7–25. doi:10.21861/HGG.2006.68.01.01. eISSN 1848-6401.

=== History ===
- Šimek, Marina; Matijaško, Martina; Šincek, Dubravko (2022). "Srednjovjekovne visinske utvrde na Ivanščici i Kalniku: Mlaka, Ivanovec, Starec" [Medieval hill forts on Ivanščica and Kalnik: Mlaka, Ivanovec, Starec]. Cris: Časopis Povijesnog društva Križevci (in Serbo-Croatian). 24 (1) (published 2023-01-28): 195–211. eISSN 1848-9621.
- Duić, Marin; Rukavina, Marko; Obad Šćitaroci, Mladen (2022-12-28). "Plemićki gradovi (burgovi) na području planiranog Parka prirode Ivanščica, Strahinjščica, Maceljska gora i Ravna gora: Prostorne mogućnosti očuvanja i unaprjeđenja" [Medieval Castles (Burgs) in the Area of the Planned Nature Park Ivanščica, Strahinjščica, Maceljska Gora and Ravna Gora: Spatial Possibilities of Preservation and Enhancement]. Radovi Zavoda za znanstveni rad Varaždin (in Croatian) (33): 147–167. doi:10.21857/ydkx2copn9. ISSN 1848-7890.

=== Linguistics ===
- Lipljin, Tomislav (2002-06-15). "Kajkavsko narječje u kazalištu" [Kajkavian Dialect in the Theatre]. Kazalište: časopis za kazališnu umjetnost (in Croatian). 5 (9–10): 120–127. ISSN 1332-3539.

=== Meteorology ===
- Počakal, Damir (2005-12-15). "Influence of Orography on Hail Characteristics in the Continental Part of Croatia". Hrvatski meteorološki časopis (40): 641–642. ISSN 1330-0083.

=== Speleology ===
- Matišić, Tomica; Ozimec, Roman (2014). "Speleološki objekti Ivanščice – primjer katastra supradinarika Hrvatske". Skup speleologa Hrvatske, lepoglava 21.-23. studeni 2014 [Speleological Objects of Ivanščica - An Example of a Cadastre of the Supradinarics of Croatia] (PDF) (in Croatian). pp. 14–15. ISBN 978-953-58320-0-3.
- Trinajstić, Ivo; Cerovečki, Zdravko (2009-06-30). "Festuco drymeiae-Fagetum Magic 1978 Association (Aremonio-Fagion) in the Vegetation of Northwest of Croatia". Šumarski list. 133 (5–6): 249–256. eISSN 0373-1332.

=== Zoology ===
- Skejo, Josip; et al. (2023-06-30). "Endangered Transsylvanian wingless groundhopper (Tetrix transsylvanica) is not extinct in Croatia and requires urgent protection". Natura Croatica: Periodicum Musei Historiae Naturalis Croatici. 32 (1): 241–255. doi:10.20302/NC.2023.32.17. eISSN 1848-7386.
- Koren, Toni; Lauš, Boris; Šašić, Martina; Mihoci, Iva; Štih, Ana; Bralić, Petra; Gomboc, Stanislav (2017-12-31). "Contribution to the Knowledge of the Butterfly Fauna (Lepidoptera: Papilionoidea) of Hrvatsko Zagorje, Croatia". Natura Croatica: Periodicum Musei Historiae Naturalis Croatici. 26 (2): 167–196. doi:10.20302/NC.2017.26.15. eISSN 1848-7386.
- Koren, Toni (2015-12-18). "The First Record of Trox perrisii Fairmaire, 1868 in Croatia". Entomologia Croatica. 19 (1–2): 31–35. eISSN 1849-0441.
- Koren, Toni; Gomboc, Stanislav (2015-10-31). "First record of Cherostis rectangula ([Denis and Schifferüller], 1775) in Croatia with new data for Chersotis multangula (Hübner, 1803) (Lepidoptera: Noctuidae)". Šumarski list. 139 (9–10): 441–445. eISSN 0373-1332.
