= Mali Komor =

- Village
- Interactive map of Mali Komor
- Coordinates: 46.112°N 16.018°E
- Country: Croatia
- County: Krapina-Zagorje County
- Municipality: Mače

Area
  - Total: 1.8 km^{2} (0.69 sq mi)

Population (2021)
  - Total: 79
  - Density: 44/km^{2} (110/sq mi)
- Time zone: UTC+1 (CET)
  - Summer (DST): UTC+2 (CEST)
- Postal code: 49250 Zlatar
- Area code: +385 (0)49

Mali Komor is a village in Croatia. It is known for the Sutinščica cave and the Mali Komor archaeological site.

== Demographics ==
Village of Mali Komor: Population trends 1857–2021
v

population	151	153	174	207	220	240	233	223	214	206	176	136	108	115	101	94	79
	1857	1869	1880	1890	1900	1910	1921	1931	1948	1953	1961	1971	1981	1991	2001	2011	2021

Sources: Croatian Bureau of Statistics publications
