= Očura =

- Village
- Interactive map of Očura
- Coordinates: 46.199°N 16.016°E
- Country: Croatia
- County: Varaždin County
- Town: Lepoglava

Area
  - Total: 5.7 km^{2} (2.2 sq mi)

Population (2021)
  - Total: 152
  - Density: 27/km^{2} (69/sq mi)
- Time zone: UTC+1 (CET)
  - Summer (DST): UTC+2 (CEST)
- 42250 Lepoglava: +385 (0)42

Očura is a village of the town of Lepoglava, Varaždin County, in northern Croatia. It is known for the Voska luknja cave.

== Demographics ==
Village of Očura: Population trends 1857–2021
v

population	114	134	140	159	184	250	255	249	273	277	301	310	278	248	244	188	152
	1857	1869	1880	1890	1900	1910	1921	1931	1948	1953	1961	1971	1981	1991	2001	2011	2021

Note:Until 1900 and from 1981 it has been listed simply "Očura". From 1910 to 1971 it was listed as "Očura Lepoglavska". In 1981, the uninhabited part of Šumec was added to it (the inhabited part was added to Lepoglava). Sources: Croatian Bureau of Statistics publications
