= Bednja (river) =

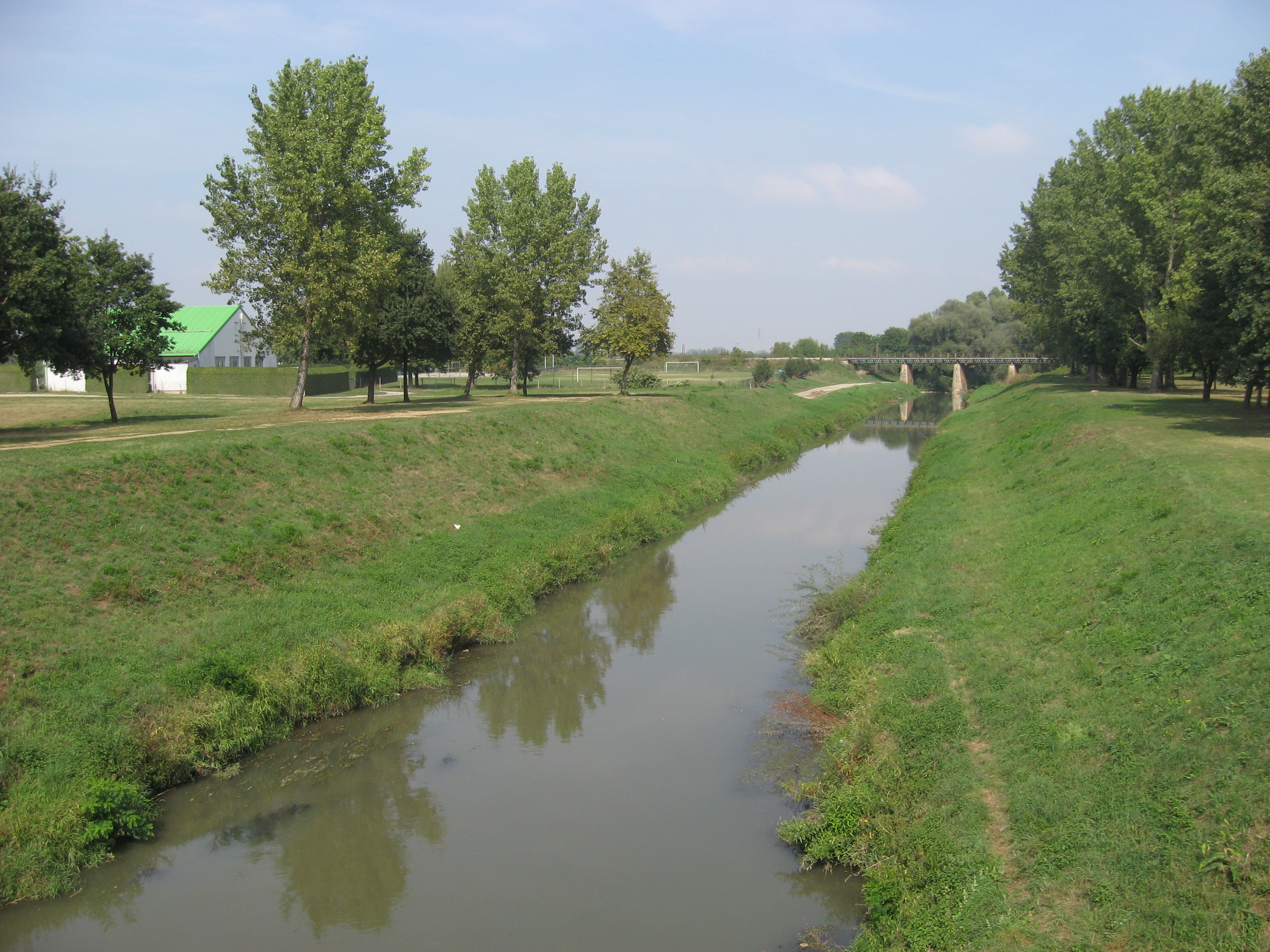
- The Bednja in Ludbreg.

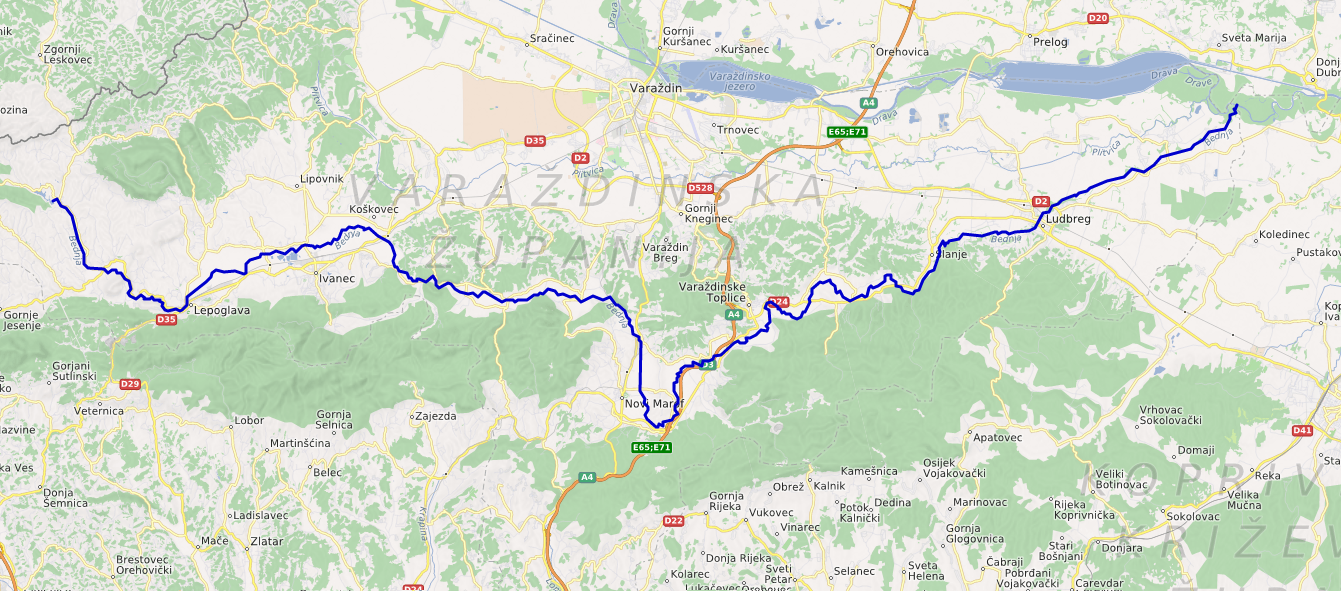

Location
- Country: Croatia

Physical characteristics
- Mouth
  - location: Drava
  - coordinates: 46.3033°N 16.7564°E
- Length: 133 km (83 mi)
- Basin size: 966 km^{2} (373 sq mi)

Basin features
- Progression: Drava→ Danube→ Black Sea

The Bednja (Croatian pronunciation: [bêdɲa]) is a river in northern Croatia, a right tributary of the Drava. It is 133 kilometres (83 mi) long and its basin covers an area of 966 square kilometres (373 sq mi). The Bednja rises in the mountainous forested areas near Macelj in northern Croatia, west of Trakošćan, where it also forms a 0.2 km^{2} (0.077 sq mi) lake at 255 m.a.s.l. It flows towards the southeast until turning east near the village of Bednja, meandering south at Novi Marof, returning to its eastward course shortly thereafter, and then turning northeast toward Ludbreg. It flows into the Drava River north of Mali Bukovec, at 46.303333°N 16.756389°E.

It was called "Serapia" in antiquity. The name "Serapia" is supposed to come from Proto-Indo-European words *ser (to flow) and *h2ep (water).

== Bibliography ==
- Koren, Toni; Lauš, Boris; Šašić, Martina; Mihoci, Iva; Štih, Ana; Bralić, Petra; Gomboc, Stanislav (2017-12-31). "Contribution to the Knowledge of the Butterfly Fauna (Lepidoptera: Papilionoidea) of Hrvatsko Zagorje, Croatia". Natura Croatica: Periodicum Musei Historiae Naturalis Croatici. 26 (2): 167–196. doi:10.20302/NC.2017.26.15. eISSN 1848-7386.
