= Mali Bukovec, Varaždin County =

Mali Bukovec
- Municipality
- Location of Mali Bukovec in Croatia
- Coordinates: 46°16′48″N 16°44′24″E
- Country: Croatia
- County: Varaždin County

Government
  - Municipal mayor: Darko Marković (HSS)

Area
  - Municipality: 36.6 km^{2} (14.1 sq mi)
  - Urban: 11.9 km^{2} (4.6 sq mi)

Population (2021)
  - Municipality: 1,809
  - Density: 49.4/km^{2} (128/sq mi)
  - Urban: 616
  - Urban density: 51.8/km^{2} (134/sq mi)
- Time zone: UTC+1 (CET)
  - Summer (DST): UTC+2 (CEST)
- Postal code: 42231 Mali Bukovec
- Area code: +385 (0)42
- Website: mali-bukovec.hr

Mali Bukovec is a village and municipality in Croatia in Varaždin County.

In the 2011 census, there were 2,212 inhabitants, in the following settlements:

- Lunjkovec, population 215
- Mali Bukovec, population 729
- Martinić, population 137
- Novo Selo Podravsko, population 221
- Sveti Petar, population 710
- Županec, population 200

In the same census, the absolute majority were Croats.
