= Lepoglava =

Town in Varaždin County, Croatia

- City
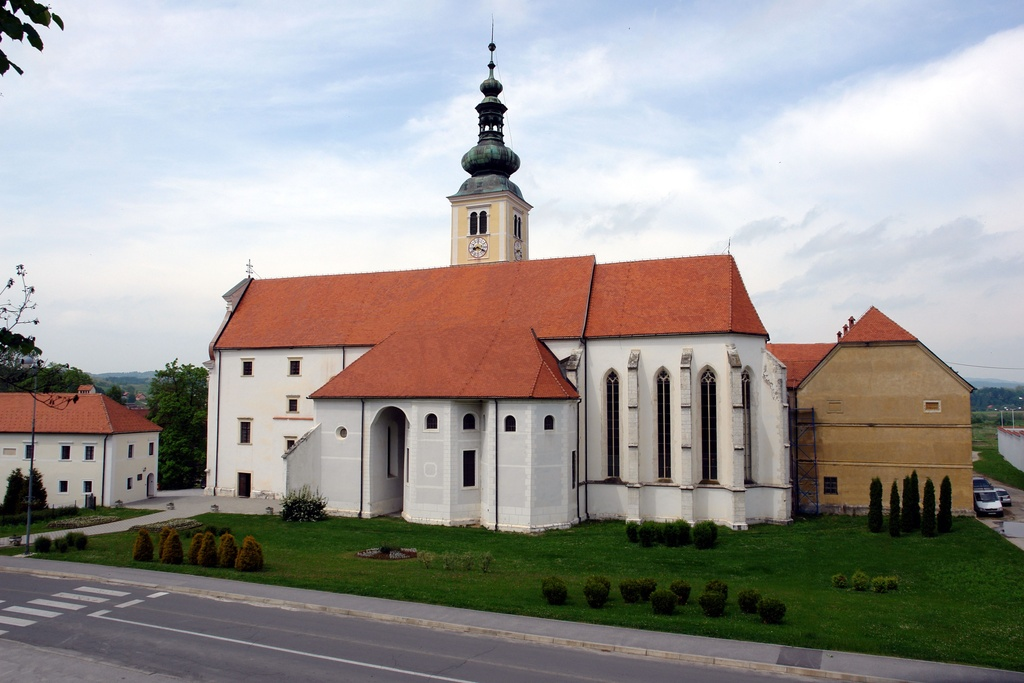
- Lepoglava monastery
- Interactive map of Lepoglava
- Location of Lepoglava in Croatia
- Coordinates: 46.207399°N 16.043748°E
- Country: Croatia
- Region: Central Croatia (Hrvatsko Zagorje)
- County: Varaždin County

Government
  - Mayor: Lea Oreški (HNS)

Area
  - City: 65.9 km^{2} (25.4 sq mi)
  - Urban: 15.0 km^{2} (5.8 sq mi)

Population (2021)
  - City: 6,945
  - Density: 105/km^{2} (273/sq mi)
  - Urban: 4,009
  - Urban density: 267/km^{2} (692/sq mi)
- Time zone: UTC+1 (Central European Time)
- Website: lepoglava.hr

Lepoglava is a town in Varaždin County, northern Croatia, It is located 32 km southwest of Varaždin, 7 km west of Ivanec, and 22 km northeast of Krapina.

== Demographics ==
A total of 8,283 residents in the municipality (2011 census) live in the following settlements:

- Bednjica, population 209
- Crkovec, population 188
- Donja Višnjica, population 542
- Gornja Višnjica, population 271
- Jazbina Višnjička, population 25
- Kamenica, population 141
- Kamenički Vrhovec, population 205
- Kameničko Podgorje, population 322
- Lepoglava, population 4,174
- Muričevec, population 195
- Očura, population 188
- Viletinec, population 173
- Vulišinec, population 237
- Zalužje, population 162
- Zlogonje, population 412
- Žarovnica, population 839

== History ==
Lepoglava is probably best known for hosting the main Croatian prison, the Lepoglava prison. In 1854, a monastery of the Pauline Fathers was transformed by the authorities into a prison. In the twentieth century, the prison was used to intern political prisoners by the authorities of Kingdom of Yugoslavia, the Independent State of Croatia, and SFR Yugoslavia.

During WWII, the Lepoglava concentration camp was built by the Ustashe; around 2,000 prisoners were murdered there.

=== Prehistory and 13th century fort ===
Archaeological remains found in Kamenica (6 km north of Lepoglava) show that this place was occupied in prehistorical times. A fortified residence was built there, atop a steep hill, during the second half of the 13th century.

Višnjica (about 12 km north of Lepoglava) was also occupied during the Paleolithic Stone Age, and the earliest known written mention is from 1244.

=== The Paulines : monastery, university ===
The first mention of Lepoglava dates back to 1399. Hermann II, Count of Celje, founded the monastery of Saint Paul the Hermit in 1400. Pauline monks from Hungary soon arrived. Although it was not the first Pauline monastery in Croatia, it was destined to become the most important one.

In 1503 it opened the first gymnasium in Continental Croatia, with the creation of a seminary for Pauline novices and the lay-youth; but this ceased to operate after the Battle of Mohács in 1526. In 1582 it founded the first public grammar school of Croatia. Higher education started in 1656 with the creation of courses in philosophy and theology, and the establishment gained the status of university in 1674 - the first one in Croatia. Some 75 doctorate dissertations were obtained there. The associated library grew to become the largest and richest library in Croatia.

The monks left in 1768 and the Pauline order was abolished in 1786 by King Joseph II. In 1854 the monastery became a prison. It was returned to the diocese of Varaždin in 2001.

Four priors of the Lepoglava monastery became bishops of Zagreb : Vuk Gyula (1548-1550), Šimun Bratulić (1603-1611), Martin Borković (1668–1687) and Mirko (Emerik) Esterhazy (1709-1727).

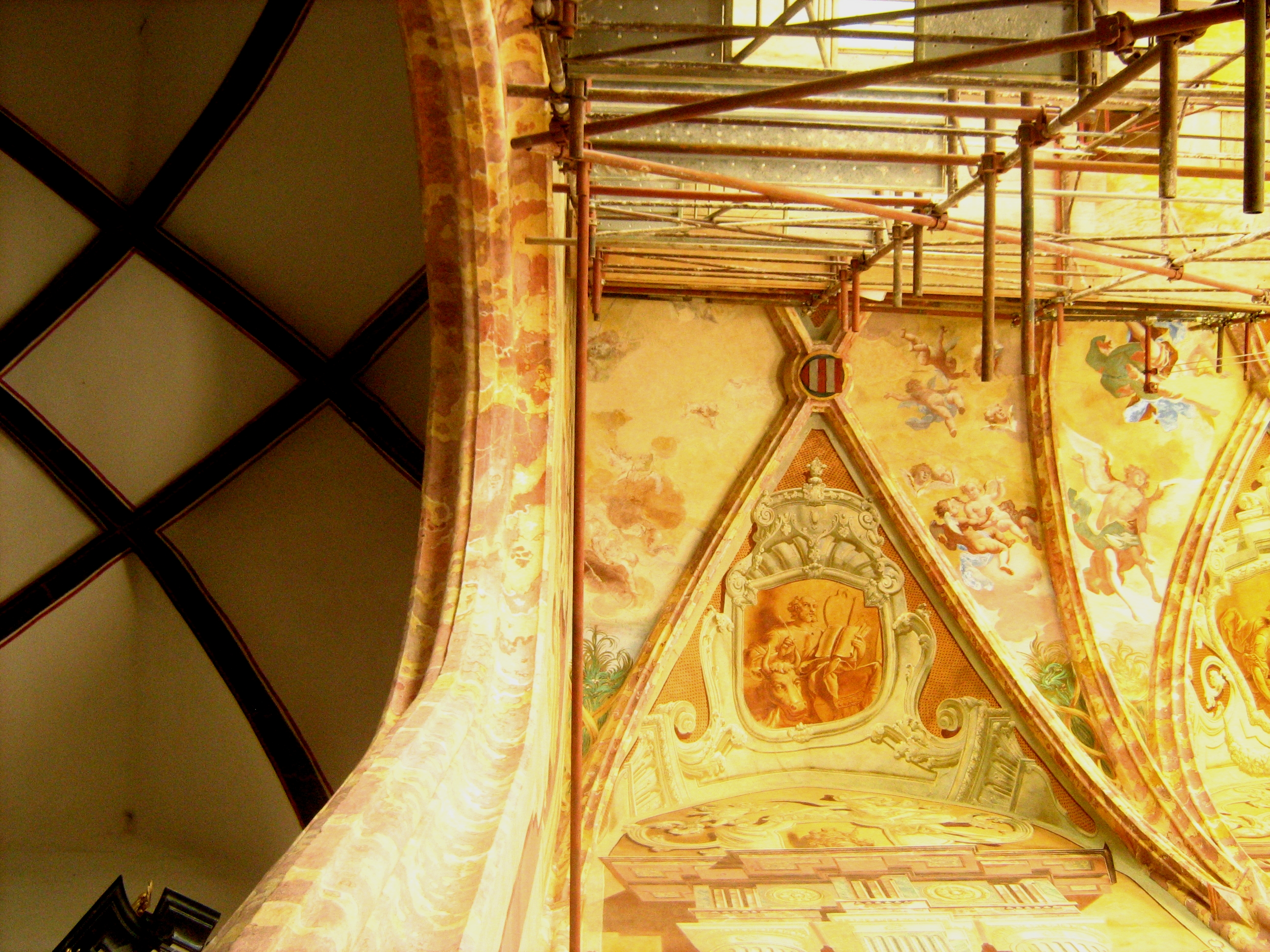
Gothic vaulting in the parish church in Lepoglava. To the left is the original Gothic vaulting. To the right is the sanctuary vault painted in Baroque style by Ivan Ranger

The famous painter Ivan Krstitelj Ranger (1700-1753) joined the monastery as a layman in 1734. He painted Lepoglava's church and monastery as well as a number of churches and chapels near Lepoglava and elsewhere, with most of his work dedicated to the Virgin Mary. He died in 1753 in Lepoglava and is buried in the church there.

Linguist Ivan Belostenec (1593-1675) completed his initial studies at the Pauline school of Lepoglava, then studied philosophy in Vienna and theology in Rome. He was among the first Paulines who studied at Jesuit schools to train as professors for Pauline schools. Having subsequently held several positions of authority in the order, he retired to Lepoglava monastery in 1663 and worked there on his most important work: the ‘Gazophylacium’, a two-volume Latin-Croatian dictionary that also includes three Croatian dialects and a proposition for a new script making a significant improvement on the Latin script previously used within Croatia. This Gazophylacium was printed posthumously in Zagreb in 1740.
He also wrote the ‘Boghomila’, a collection of 113 verses – one verse for each year of saint Paul of Thebes' life; this was printed before the ‘Gazophylacium’.

== Recent ==
The DVD "Kaznionica u Lepoglavi" was founded in 1950.

== Lace: Intangible cultural heritage ==
Lepoglava has a unique tradition of fine bobbin lace which was listed by Unesco as Intangible cultural heritage in 2009, along with Pag's needlepoint lace and the unique aloe fiber lace from Hvar.

=== History ===
The start of lace-making tradition

Lepoglava's tradition of lace-making started around 1400 with the arrival of Hungarian Pauline monks, who taught their weaving and lace-making craft to the local population. Initially applied to productions for the clergy and the nobility, it then spread to the general population, the decorated white linen clothing and turbans thus making for distinctive characteristics in the local traditional clothes and folk decoration refinements. It then became part of the ethnographic heritage.

Height of Lepoglava lace, first half of 20th century

At the turn of the 20th century, the Honorable Zlata Šufflay first organized the production of lace. After the First World War, her work was most successfully pursued by Danica Brossler, who used official institutions to encourage manufacturing and started lace-making lessons, workshops and schools. Bringing a more reliable income complement to its makers, the lace was sold at markets, exhibits - including the Zagreb Trade Fair -, and throughout Western Europe. Lepoglava lace won a gold medal at Paris' 1937 World Fair and a bronze one in 1939 in Berlin.

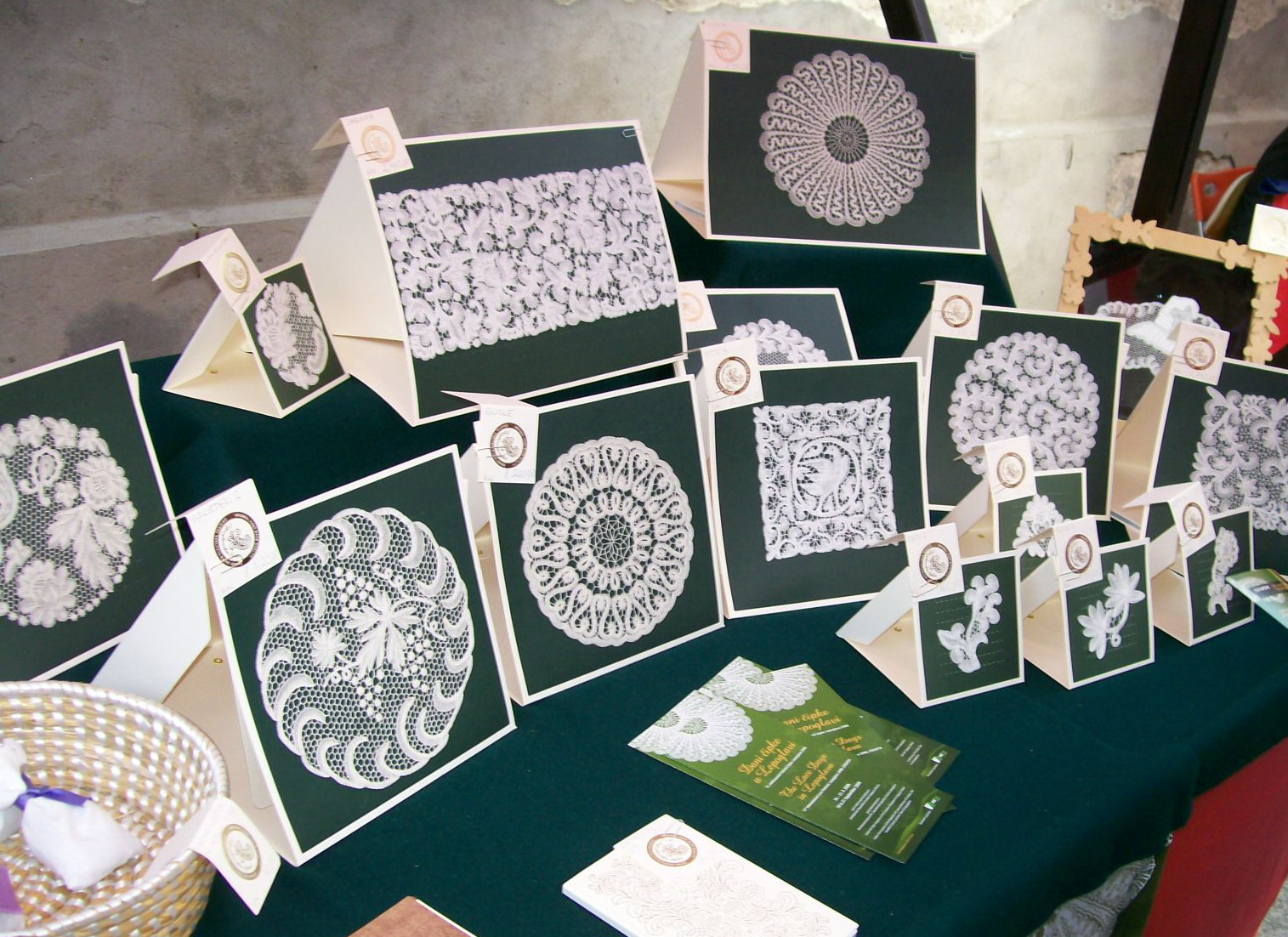
Lepoglava lace

Today

In 2011, Lepoglava lace was declared the most beautiful lace at the International lace contest in Vologda, Russia, competing against 570 lace makers from 10 countries and 36 Russian areas.

Since 1997, Lepoglava holds a yearly International Lace Festival, which received from the European Festivals Association (EFA) the title of Remarkable Festival in 2017 - celebrating the 80th anniversary of the opening of the Banate lace-making school in Lepoglava.
The scale of the International Lace Festival has gradually expanded following the 2009 Unesco listing of Lepoglava Lace as a World Intangible Cultural Heritage along with Pag lace and Hvar lace. More than 16 countries participated at the September 2019 International Lace Festival. The 25th festival in 2023 focused on a retrospective of what has been in show in the past 25 festivals. Austria, Belgium, Bosnia and Herzegovina, Bulgaria, Croatia, Estonia, France, Malta, Poland, Slovakia, Slovenia and Hungary planned to participate; it was held in the Pauline monastery.

The Croatian Mint has issued a series of gold collector coins “Lace-making in Croatia”, and a series of postal stamps on lace has also been issued.

=== Description ===
Lepoglava lace is a bobbin lace made on a round hard pillow (‘dedek’), using a paired number of bobbins (‘bateki’) and very fine cotton or linen threads in white or beige across a pricking card. It displays stylized forms of flora, fauna, baroque, and geometric motifs. The space between the motifs can be filled with various types of nets: nets with loops, spider web, honeycombs with leaves, chessboard, a letter ‘K’, diagonal net.

== See also ==
- Bračkova špilja
