= Physical properties of soil =

The physical properties of soil, in order of decreasing importance for ecosystem services such as crop production, are texture, structure, bulk density, porosity, consistency, temperature, colour and resistivity. Soil texture is determined by the relative proportion of the three kinds of soil mineral particles, called soil separates: sand, silt, and clay. At the next larger scale, soil structures called peds or more commonly soil aggregates are created from the soil separates when iron oxides, carbonates, clay, silica and humus, coat particles and cause them to adhere into larger, relatively stable secondary structures. Soil bulk density, when determined at standardized moisture conditions, is an estimate of soil compaction. Soil porosity consists of the void part of the soil volume and is occupied by gases or water. Soil consistency is the ability of soil materials to stick together. Soil temperature and colour are self-defining. Resistivity refers to the resistance to conduction of electric currents and affects the rate of corrosion of metal and concrete structures which are buried in soil. These properties vary through the depth of a soil profile, i.e. through soil horizons. Most of these properties determine the aeration of the soil and the ability of water to infiltrate and to be held within the soil.

Influence of soil texture separates on some properties of soils
Property/behavior	Sand	Silt	Clay
Water-holding capacity	Low	Medium to high	High
Aeration	Good	Medium	Poor
Drainage rate	High	Slow to medium	Very slow
Soil organic matter level	Low	Medium to high	High to medium
Decomposition of organic matter	Rapid	Medium	Slow
Warm-up in spring	Rapid	Moderate	Slow
Compactability	Low	Medium	High
Susceptibility to wind erosion	Moderate (High if fine sand)	High	Low
Susceptibility to water erosion	Low (unless fine sand)	High	Low if aggregated, otherwise high
Shrink/Swell Potential	Very Low	Low	Moderate to very high
Sealing of ponds, dams, and landfills	Poor	Poor	Good
Suitability for tillage after rain	Good	Medium	Poor
Pollutant leaching potential	High	Medium	Low (unless cracked)
Ability to store plant nutrients	Poor	Medium to High	High
Resistance to pH change	Low	Medium	High

== Texture ==
Soil types by clay, silt, and sand composition as used by the USDA

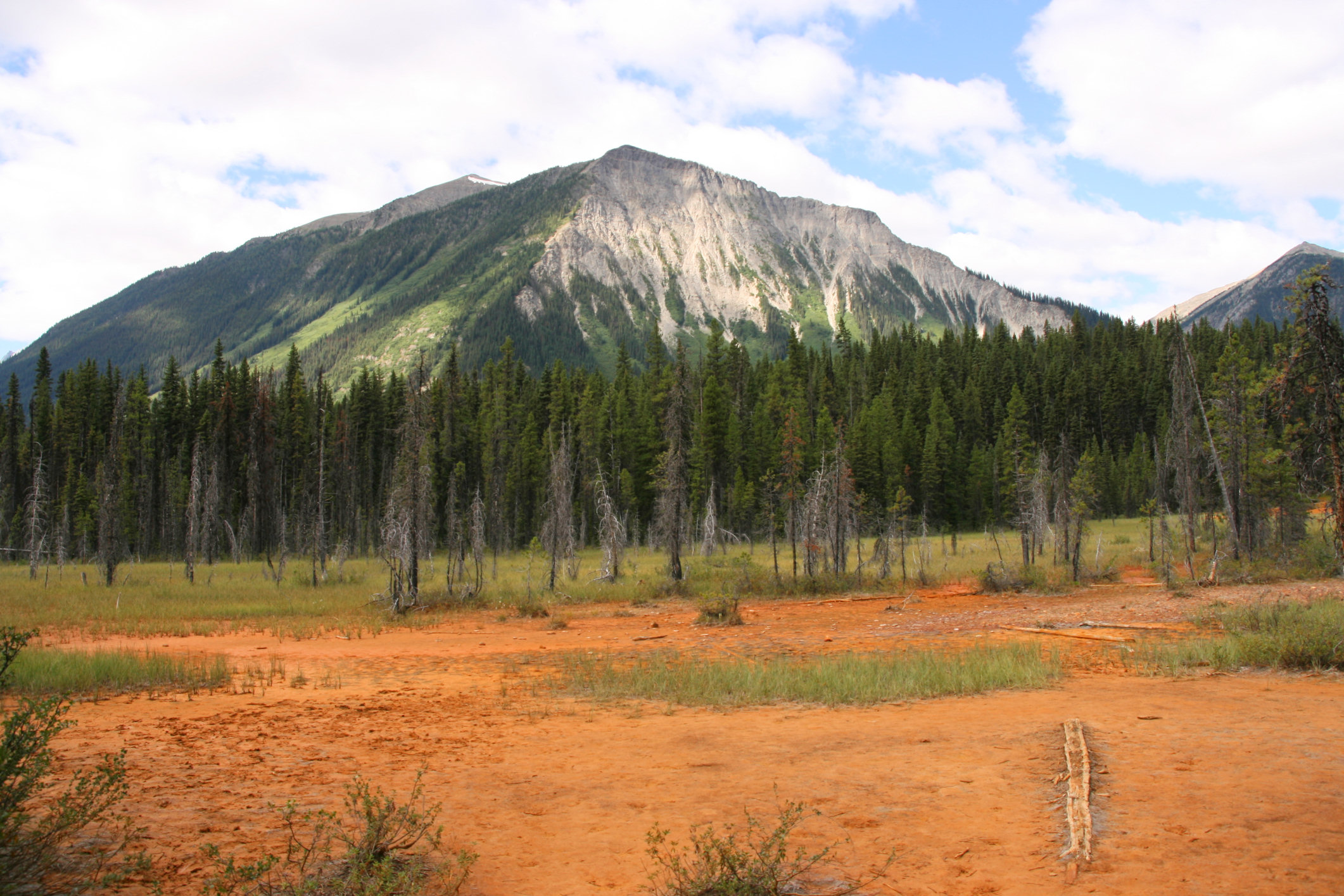
Iron-rich soil near Paint Pots in Kootenay National Park, Canada

The mineral components of soil are sand, silt and clay, and their relative proportions determine the soil texture. Properties that are influenced by soil texture include porosity, permeability, infiltration, shrink-swell rate, water-holding capacity, and susceptibility to erosion. In the illustrated USDA textural classification triangle, the only soil in which neither sand, silt nor clay predominates is called loam. While even pure sand, silt or clay may be considered a soil, from the perspective of conventional agriculture a loam soil with a small amount of organic material is considered ideal, inasmuch as fertilizers or manure are currently used to mitigate nutrient losses due to crop yields in the long term. The mineral constituents of a loam soil might be 40% sand, 40% silt and the balance 20% clay by weight. Soil texture affects soil behaviour, in particular, its retention capacity for nutrients (e.g., cation exchange capacity) and water.

Sand and silt are the products of physical and chemical weathering of the parent rock; clay, on the other hand, is most often the product of the precipitation of the dissolved parent rock as a secondary mineral, except when derived from the weathering of mica. It is the surface area to volume ratio (specific surface area) of soil particles and the unbalanced ionic electric charges within those that determine their role in the fertility of soil, as measured by its cation exchange capacity. Sand is least active, having the least specific surface area, followed by silt; clay is the most active. Sand's greatest benefit to soil is that it resists compaction and increases soil porosity, although this property stands only for pure sand, not for sand mixed with smaller minerals which fill the voids among sand grains. Silt is mineralogically like sand but with its higher specific surface area it is more chemically and physically active than sand. But it is the clay content of soil, with its very high specific surface area and generally large number of negative charges, that gives a soil its high retention capacity for water and nutrients. Clay soils also resist wind and water erosion better than silty and sandy soils, as the particles bond tightly to each other, and that with a strong mitigation effect of organic matter.

Sand is the most stable of the mineral components of soil; it consists of rock fragments, primarily quartz particles, ranging in size from 2.0 to 0.05 mm (0.0787 to 0.0020 in) in diameter. Silt ranges in size from 0.05 to 0.002 mm (0.001969 to 7.9×10^{−5} in). Clay cannot be resolved by optical microscopes as its particles are 0.002 mm (7.9×10^{−5} in) or less in diameter and a thickness of only 10 angstroms (10^{−10} m). In medium-textured soils, clay is often washed downward through the soil profile (a process called eluviation) and accumulates in the subsoil (a process called illuviation). There is no clear relationship between the size of soil mineral components and their mineralogical nature: sand and silt particles can be calcareous as well as siliceous, while textural clay (0.002 mm (7.9×10^{−5} in)) can be made of very fine quartz particles as well as of multi-layered secondary minerals. Soil mineral components belonging to a given textural class may thus share properties linked to their specific surface area (e.g. moisture retention) but not those linked to their chemical composition (e.g. cation exchange capacity).

Soil components larger than 2.0 mm (0.079 in) are classed as rock and gravel and are removed before determining the percentages of the remaining components and the textural class of the soil, but are included in the name. For example, a sandy loam soil with 20% gravel would be called gravelly sandy loam.

When the organic component of a soil is substantial, the soil is called organic soil rather than mineral soil. A soil is called organic if:

1. Mineral fraction is 0% clay and organic matter is 20% or more
2. Mineral fraction is 0% to 50% clay and organic matter is between 20% and 30%
3. Mineral fraction is 50% or more clay and organic matter 30% or more.

== Structure ==
The clumping of the soil textural components of sand, silt and clay causes aggregates to form and the further association of those aggregates into larger units creates soil structures called peds (a contraction of the word pedolith). The adhesion of the soil textural components by organic substances, iron oxides, carbonates, clays, and silica, the breakage of those aggregates from expansion-contraction caused by freezing-thawing and wetting-drying cycles, and the build-up of aggregates by soil animals, microbial colonies and root tips shape soil into distinct geometric forms. The peds evolve into units which have various shapes, sizes and degrees of development. A soil clod, however, is not a ped but rather a mass of soil that results from mechanical disturbance of the soil such as cultivation. Soil structure affects aeration, water movement, conduction of heat, plant root growth and resistance to erosion. Water, in turn, has a strong effect on soil structure, directly via the dissolution and precipitation of minerals, the mechanical destruction of aggregates (slaking) and indirectly by promoting plant, animal and microbial growth.

Soil structure often gives clues to its texture, organic matter content, biological activity, past soil evolution, human use, and the chemical and mineralogical conditions under which the soil formed. While texture is defined by the mineral component of a soil and is an innate property of the soil that does not change with agricultural activities, soil structure can be improved or destroyed by the choice and timing of farming practices.

Soil structural classes:

1. Types: Shape and arrangement of peds
  1. Platy: Peds are flattened one atop the other 1–10 mm thick. Found in the A-horizon of forest soils and lake sedimentation.
  2. Prismatic and Columnar: Prismlike peds are long in the vertical dimension, 10–100 mm wide. Prismatic peds have flat tops, columnar peds have rounded tops. Tend to form in the B-horizon in high sodium soil where clay has accumulated.
  3. Angular and subangular: Blocky peds are imperfect cubes, 5–50 mm, angular have sharp edges, subangular have rounded edges. Tend to form in the B-horizon where clay has accumulated and indicate poor water penetration.
  4. Granular and Crumb: Spheroid peds of polyhedrons, 1–10 mm, often found in the A-horizon in the presence of organic material. Crumb peds are more porous and are considered ideal.
2. Classes: Size of peds whose ranges depend upon the above type
  1. Very fine or very thin: <1 mm platy and spherical; <5 mm blocky; <10 mm prismlike.
  2. Fine or thin: 1–2 mm platy, and spherical; 5–10 mm blocky; 10–20 mm prismlike.
  3. Medium: 2–5 mm platy, granular; 10–20 mm blocky; 20–50 prismlike.
  4. Coarse or thick: 5–10 mm platy, granular; 20–50 mm blocky; 50–100 mm prismlike.
  5. Very coarse or very thick: >10 mm platy, granular; >50 mm blocky; >100 mm prismlike.
3. Grades: Is a measure of the degree of development or cementation within the peds that results in their strength and stability.
  1. Weak: Weak cementation allows peds to fall apart into the three textural constituents, sand, silt and clay.
  2. Moderate: Peds are not distinct in undisturbed soil but when removed they break into aggregates, some broken aggregates and little unaggregated material. This is considered ideal.
  3. Strong:Peds are distinct before removed from the profile and do not break apart easily.
  4. Structureless: Soil is entirely cemented together in one great mass such as slabs of clay or no cementation at all such as with sand.

At the largest scale, the forces that shape a soil's structure result from swelling and shrinkage that initially tend to act horizontally, causing vertically oriented prismatic peds. This mechanical process is mainly exemplified in the development of vertisols. Clayey soil, due to its differential drying rate with respect to the surface, will induce horizontal cracks, reducing columns to blocky peds. Roots, rodents, worms, and freezing-thawing cycles further break the peds into smaller peds of a more or less spherical shape.

At a smaller scale, plant roots extend into voids (macropores) and remove water causing macroporosity to increase and microporosity to decrease, thereby decreasing aggregate size. At the same time, root hairs and fungal hyphae create microscopic tunnels (micropores) that break up peds.

At an even smaller scale, soil aggregation continues as bacteria and fungi exude sticky polysaccharides which bind soil into smaller peds. The addition of the raw organic matter that bacteria and fungi feed upon encourages the formation of this desirable soil structure.

At the lowest scale, the soil chemistry affects the aggregation or dispersal of soil particles. The clay particles contain polyvalent cations, such as aluminium, which give the faces of clay layers localized negative electric charges. At the same time, the edges of the clay plates have a slight positive charge, due to the sorption of aluminium from the soil solution to exposed hydroxyl groups, thereby allowing the edges to adhere to the negative charges on the faces of other clay particles or to flocculate (form clumps). On the other hand, when monovalent ions, such as sodium, invade and displace the polyvalent cations (single displacement reaction), they weaken the positive charges on the edges, while the negative surface charges are relatively strengthened. This leaves negative charge on the clay faces that repel other clay, causing the particles to push apart, and by doing so deflocculate clay suspensions. As a result, the clay disperses and settles into voids between peds, causing those to close. In this way the open structure of the soil is destroyed and the soil is made impenetrable to air and water. Such sodic soil (also called haline soil) tends to form columnar peds near the surface.

== Density ==
Representative bulk densities of soils. The percentage pore space was calculated using 2.7 g/cm^{3} for particle density except for the peat soil, which is estimated.
Soil treatment and identification	Bulk density (g/cm^{3})	Pore space (%)
Tilled surface soil of a cotton field	1.3	51
Trafficked inter-rows where wheels passed surface	1.67	37
Traffic pan at 25 cm deep	1.7	36
Undisturbed soil below traffic pan, clay loam	1.5	43
Rocky silt loam soil under aspen forest	1.62	40
Loamy sand surface soil	1.5	43
Decomposed peat	0.55	65

Soil particle density is typically 2.60 to 2.75 grams per cm^{3} and is usually unchanging for a given soil. Soil particle density is lower for soils with high organic matter content, and is higher for soils with high iron-oxides content. Soil bulk density is equal to the dry mass of the soil divided by the volume of the soil; i.e., it includes air space and organic materials of the soil volume. Thereby soil bulk density is always less than soil particle density and is a good indicator of soil compaction. The soil bulk density of cultivated loam is about 1.1 to 1.4 g/cm^{3} (for comparison water is 1.0 g/cm^{3}). Contrary to particle density, soil bulk density is highly variable for a given soil, with a strong causal relationship with soil biological activity and management strategies. However, it has been shown that, depending on species and the size of their aggregates (faeces), earthworms may either increase or decrease soil bulk density. A lower bulk density by itself does not indicate suitability for plant growth due to the confounding influence of soil texture and structure. A high bulk density is indicative of either soil compaction or a mixture of soil textural classes in which small particles fill the voids among coarser particles. Hence the positive correlation between the fractal dimension of soil, considered as a porous medium, and its bulk density, that explains the poor hydraulic conductivity of silty clay loam in the absence of a faunal structure.

== Porosity ==
Pore space is that part of the bulk volume of soil that is not occupied by either mineral or organic matter but is open space occupied by either gases or water. In a productive, medium-textured soil the total pore space is typically about 50% of the soil volume. Pore size varies considerably; the smallest pores (cryptopores; <0.1 μm) hold water too tightly for use by plant roots; plant-available water is held in ultramicropores, micropores and mesopores (0.1–75 μm); and macropores (>75 μm) are generally air-filled when the soil is at field capacity.

Soil texture determines total volume of the smallest pores; clay soils have smaller pores, but more total pore space than sands, despite a much lower permeability. Soil structure has a strong influence on the larger pores that affect soil aeration, water infiltration and drainage. Tillage has the short-term benefit of temporarily increasing the number of pores of largest size, but these can be rapidly degraded by the destruction of soil aggregation.

The pore size distribution affects the ability of plants and other organisms to access water and oxygen; large, continuous pores allow rapid transmission of air, water and dissolved nutrients through soil, and small pores store water between rainfall or irrigation events. Pore size variation also compartmentalizes the soil pore space such that many microbial and faunal organisms are not in direct competition with one another, which may explain not only the large number of species present, but the fact that functionally redundant organisms (organisms with the same ecological niche) can co-exist within the same soil.

== Consistency ==
Consistency is the ability of soil to stick to itself or to other objects (cohesion and adhesion, respectively) and its ability to resist deformation and rupture. It is of approximate use in predicting cultivation problems and the engineering of foundations. Consistency is measured at three moisture conditions: air-dry, moist, and wet. In those conditions the consistency quality depends upon the clay content. In the wet state, the two qualities of stickiness and plasticity are assessed. A soil's resistance to fragmentation and crumbling is assessed in the dry state by rubbing the sample. Its resistance to shearing forces is assessed in the moist state by thumb and finger pressure. Additionally, the cemented consistency depends on cementation by substances other than clay, such as calcium carbonate, silica, oxides and salts; moisture content has little effect on its assessment. The measures of consistency border on subjective compared to other measures such as pH, since they employ the apparent feel of the soil in those states.

The terms used to describe the soil consistency in three moisture states and a last not affected by the amount of moisture are as follows:

1. Consistency of Dry Soil: loose, soft, slightly hard, hard, very hard, extremely hard
2. Consistency of Moist Soil: loose, very friable, friable, firm, very firm, extremely firm
3. Consistency of Wet Soil: nonsticky, slightly sticky, sticky, very sticky; nonplastic, slightly plastic, plastic, very plastic
4. Consistency of Cemented Soil: weakly cemented, strongly cemented, indurated (requires hammer blows to break up)

Soil consistency is useful in estimating the ability of soil to support buildings and roads. More precise measures of soil strength are often made prior to construction.

== Temperature ==
Soil temperature depends on the ratio of the energy absorbed to that lost. Soil has a mean annual temperature from -10 to 26 °C according to biomes. Soil temperature regulates seed germination, breaking of seed dormancy, plant and root growth and the availability of nutrients. Soil temperature has important seasonal, monthly and daily variations, fluctuations in soil temperature being much lower with increasing soil depth. Heavy mulching (a type of soil cover) can slow the warming of soil in summer, and, at the same time, reduce fluctuations in surface temperature.

Most often, agricultural activities must adapt to soil temperatures by:

1. maximizing germination and growth by timing of planting (also determined by photoperiod)
2. optimizing use of anhydrous ammonia by applying to soil below 10 °C (50 °F)
3. preventing heaving and thawing due to frosts from damaging shallow-rooted crops
4. preventing damage to desirable soil structure by freezing of saturated soils
5. improving uptake of phosphorus by plants

Soil temperatures can be raised by drying soils or the use of clear plastic mulches. Organic mulches slow the warming of the soil.

There are various factors that affect soil temperature, such as water content, soil color, and relief (slope, orientation, and elevation), and soil cover (shading and insulation), in addition to air temperature. The color of the ground cover and its insulating properties have a strong influence on soil temperature. Whiter soil tends to have a higher albedo than blacker soil cover, which encourages whiter soils to have lower soil temperatures. The specific heat of soil is the energy required to raise the temperature of soil by 1 °C. The specific heat of soil increases as water content increases, since the heat capacity of water is greater than that of dry soil. The specific heat capacity of pure water is ~ 1 calorie per gram, the specific heat capacity of dry soil is ~ 0.2 calories per gram, hence, the specific heat capacity of wet soil is ~ 0.2 to 1 calories per gram (0.8 to 4.2 kJ per kilogram). Also, a tremendous energy (~584 cal/g or 2442 kJ/kg at 25 °C) is required to evaporate water (known as the heat of vaporization). As such, wet soil usually warms more slowly than dry soil – wet surface soil is typically 3 to 6 °C colder than dry surface soil.

Soil heat flux refers to the rate at which heat energy moves through the soil in response to a temperature difference between two points in the soil. The heat flux density is the amount of energy that flows through soil per unit area per unit time and has both magnitude and direction. For the simple case of conduction into or out of the soil in the vertical direction, which is most often applicable the heat flux density is:

$$q_x  = - k \frac{\delta T}{\delta x}$$

In SI units

$q$ is the heat flux density, in SI the units are W·m^{−2}
$k$ is the soils' conductivity, W·m^{−1}·K^{−1}. The thermal conductivity is sometimes a constant, otherwise an average value of conductivity for the soil condition between the surface and the point at depth is used.
$\delta T$ is the temperature difference (temperature gradient) between the two points in the soil between which the heat flux density is to be calculated. In SI the units are kelvin, K.
$\delta x$ is the distance between the two points within the soil, at which the temperatures are measured and between which the heat flux density is being calculated. In SI the units are meters m, and where x is measured positive downward.

Heat flux is in the direction opposite the temperature gradient, hence the minus sign. That is to say, if the temperature of the surface is higher than at depth x, the negative sign will result in a positive value for the heat flux q, and which is interpreted as the heat being conducted into the soil.

Component	Thermal Conductivity (W·m‐1·K‐1)
Quartz	8.8
Clay	2.9
Organic matter	0.25
Water	0.57
Ice	2.4
Air	0.025
Dry soil	0.2‐0.4
Wet soil	1–3

(Source)

Soil temperature is important for the survival and early growth of seedlings. Soil temperatures affect the anatomical and morphological character of root systems. All physical, chemical, and biological processes in soil and roots are affected in particular because of the increased viscosities of water and protoplasm at low temperatures. In general, climates that do not preclude survival and growth of white spruce above ground are sufficiently benign to provide soil temperatures able to maintain white spruce root systems. In some northwestern parts of the range, white spruce occurs on permafrost sites and although young unlignified roots of conifers may have little resistance to freezing, the root system of containerized white spruce was not affected by exposure to a temperature of 5 to 20 °C.

Optimum temperatures for tree root growth range between 10 °C and 25 °C in general and for spruce in particular. In 2-week-old white spruce seedlings that were then grown for 6 weeks in soil at temperatures of 15 °C, 19 °C, 23 °C, 27 °C, and 31 °C; shoot height, shoot dry weight, stem diameter, root penetration, root volume, and root dry weight all reached maxima at 19 °C.

However, whereas strong positive relationships between soil temperature (5 °C to 25 °C) and growth have been found in trembling aspen and balsam poplar, white and other spruce species have shown little or no changes in growth with increasing soil temperature. Such insensitivity to soil low temperature may be common among a number of western and boreal conifers.

Soil temperatures are increasing worldwide under the influence of present-day global climate warming, with opposing views about expected effects on carbon capture and storage and feedback loops to climate change Most threats are about permafrost thawing and attended effects on carbon destocking and ecosystem collapse.

== Colour ==
Soil colour is often the first impression one has when viewing soil. Striking colours and contrasting patterns are especially noticeable. The Red River of the South carries sediment eroded from extensive reddish soils like Port Silt Loam in Oklahoma. The Yellow River in China carries yellow sediment from eroding loess soils. Mollisols in the Great Plains of North America are darkened and enriched by organic matter. Podsols in boreal forests have highly contrasting layers due to acidity and leaching.

In general, color is determined by the organic matter content, drainage conditions, and degree of oxidation. Soil color, while easily discerned, has little use in predicting soil characteristics. It is of use in distinguishing boundaries of horizons within a soil profile, determining the origin of a soil's parent material, as an indication of wetness and waterlogged conditions, and as a qualitative means of measuring organic, iron oxide and clay contents of soils. Color is recorded in the Munsell color system as for instance 10YR3/4 Dusky Red, with 10YR as hue, 3 as value and 4 as chroma. Munsell color dimensions (hue, value and chroma) can be averaged among samples and treated as quantitative parameters, displaying significant correlations with various soil and vegetation properties.

Soil color is primarily influenced by soil mineralogy. Many soil colours are due to various iron minerals. The development and distribution of colour in a soil profile result from chemical and biological weathering, especially redox reactions. As the primary minerals in soil parent material weather, the elements combine into new and colourful compounds. Iron forms secondary minerals of a yellow or red colour, organic matter decomposes into black and brown humic compounds, and manganese and sulfur can form black mineral deposits. These pigments can produce various colour patterns within a soil. Aerobic conditions produce uniform or gradual colour changes, while reducing environments (anaerobic) result in rapid colour flow with complex, mottled patterns and points of colour concentration.

== Resistivity ==
Soil resistivity is a measure of a soil's ability to retard the conduction of an electric current. The electrical resistivity of soil can affect the rate of corrosion of metallic structures in contact with the soil. Higher moisture content or increased electrolyte concentration can lower resistivity and increase conductivity, thereby increasing the rate of corrosion. Soil resistivity values typically range from about 1 to 100000 Ω·m, extreme values being for saline soils and dry soils overlaying crystalline rocks, respectively.

== See also ==
- Soil liquefaction
- Soil matrix

== Bibliography ==
- Donahue, Roy Luther; Miller, Raymond W.; Shickluna, John C. (1977). Soils: An Introduction to Soils and Plant Growth. Prentice-Hall. ISBN 978-0-13-821918-5.
- Arizona Master Gardener. Cooperative Extension, College of Agriculture, University of Arizona.
- Stefferud, Alfred, ed. (1957). Soil: The Yearbook of Agriculture 1957. United States Department of Agriculture. OCLC 704186906.
  - Kellogg. "We Seek; We Learn". In Stefferud (1957).
  - Simonson. "What Soils Are". In Stefferud (1957).
  - Russell. "Physical Properties". In Stefferud (1957).
  - Richards & Richards. "Soil Moisture". In Stefferud (1957).
  - Wadleigh. "Growth of Plants". In Stefferud (1957).
  - Allaway. "pH, Soil Acidity, and Plant Growth". In Stefferud (1957).
  - Coleman & Mehlich. "The Chemistry of Soil pH". In Stefferud (1957).
  - Dean. "Plant Nutrition and Soil Fertility". In Stefferud (1957).
  - Allison. "Nitrogen and Soil Fertility". In Stefferud (1957).
  - Olsen & Fried. "Soil Phosphorus and Fertility". In Stefferud (1957).
  - Reitemeier. "Soil Potassium and Fertility". In Stefferud (1957).
  - Jordan & Reisenauer. "Sulfur and Soil Fertility". In Stefferud (1957).
  - Holmes & Brown. "Iron and Soil Fertility". In Stefferud (1957).
  - Seatz & Jurinak. "Zinc and Soil Fertility". In Stefferud (1957).
  - Russel. "Boron and Soil Fertility". In Stefferud (1957).
  - Reuther. "Copper and Soil Fertility". In Stefferud (1957).
  - Sherman. "Manganese and Soil Fertility". In Stefferud (1957).
  - Stout & Johnson. "Trace Elements". In Stefferud (1957).
  - Broadbent. "Organic Matter". In Stefferud (1957).
  - Clark. "Living Organisms in the Soil". In Stefferud (1957).
  - Flemming. "Soil Management and Insect Control". In Stefferud (1957).
