= Mače, Croatia =

Mače
- Interactive map of Mače
- Location within Croatia
- Coordinates: 46°5′24″N 16°1′48″E
- Country: Croatia
- County: Krapina-Zagorje County

Government
  - Mayor: Mladenka Mikulec Šimunec (SDP)

Area
  - Total: 27.8 km^{2} (10.7 sq mi)

Population (2021)
  - Total: 2,258
  - Density: 81.2/km^{2} (210/sq mi)
- Time zone: UTC+1 (CET)
  - Summer (DST): UTC+2 (CEST)
- Website: opcina-mace.hr

Mače is a village and municipality in the Krapina-Zagorje County, northern Croatia.

== History ==
Mače was first mentioned in written documents in 1444, as a parish. An older and more famous toponym than Mače is Komor, which in the 13th century was an independent estate exempt from the administration of the royal prefects. Komor was owned by one of the oldest families in Zagorje – the Bedeković family of Komor. In 1574, the Church of the Immaculate Conception of the Blessed Virgin Mary was built in Mače. The church became the center of the parish, and the town itself became the administrative center where regular and famous annual fairs were held.

== Demographics ==
In the 2021 census, there were a total of 2,258 inhabitants in the area, in the following settlements:

- Delkovec, population 112
- Frkuljevec Peršaveški, population 48
- Mače, population 675
- Mali Bukovec, population 221
- Mali Komor, population 79
- Peršaves, population 289
- Veliki Bukovec, population 292
- Veliki Komor, population 326
- Vukanci, population 216

In the same census, an absolute majority of people were Croats at 99.11%.

Mače: Population trends 1857–2021
v

population	2609	2996	3307	3772	4047	4653	4490	4627	4681	4486	4007	3596	3170	2897	2715	2534	2258
	1857	1869	1880	1890	1900	1910	1921	1931	1948	1953	1961	1971	1981	1991	2001	2011	2021

Sources: Croatian Bureau of Statistics publications

== Administration ==
The current mayor of Mače is Mladenka Mikulec Šimunec (SDP) and the Mače Municipal Council consists of 9 seats.

Groups	Councilors per group
SDP-HSS-HSU	6 / 9
HDZ	3 / 9
