= Cave popcorn =

Small mineral nodes that form in caves

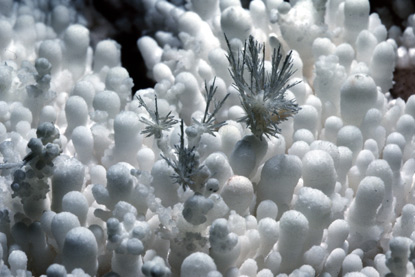
Cave popcorn with frostwork

Cave popcorn, or coralloids, are small nodes of calcite, aragonite, or gypsum that form on surfaces in caves, especially limestone caves. They are a common type of speleothem.

== Appearance ==
The individual nodules of cave popcorn range in size from 5 to 20 millimetres (0.2 to 0.8 in) and may be decorated by other speleothems, especially aragonite needles or frostwork. The nodules tend to grow in clusters on bedrock or the sides of other speleothems. These clusters may terminate suddenly in either an upward or downward direction, forming a stratographic layer. When they terminate in a downward direction, they may appear as flat-bottomed formations known as trays.

Individual nodes of popcorn can assume a variety of shapes from round to flattened ear-like or button-like shapes.

The color of cave popcorn is usually white, but various other colors are possible depending on the composition.

== Formation ==
Cave popcorn can form by precipitation. Water seeping through limestone walls or splashing onto them leaves deposits when CO_{2} loss causes its minerals to precipitate. When formed in this way, the resultant nodules have the characteristics of small balls of flowstone.

Cave popcorn can also form by evaporation in which case it is chalky and white like edible popcorn. In the right conditions, evaporative cave popcorn may grow on the windward side of the surface to which it is attached or appear on the edges of projecting surfaces.

== On manmade structures (outside the cave environment) ==
Popcorn can also occur on concrete structures outside the cave environment; these are classified as calthemite coralloids. Calthemite coralloids also occur in "artificial caves", such as mines, railways, or vehicle tunnels where there is a source of lime, mortar, or cement from which the calcium ions can be leached.

Coralloids can form by a number of different methods in caves; however, the most common form on concrete is created when a hyperalkaline solution seeps from fine cracks. Due to solution evaporation, deposition of calcium carbonate occurs before any drop can form. The resulting coralloids are small and chalky with a cauliflower appearance.

== Gallery ==
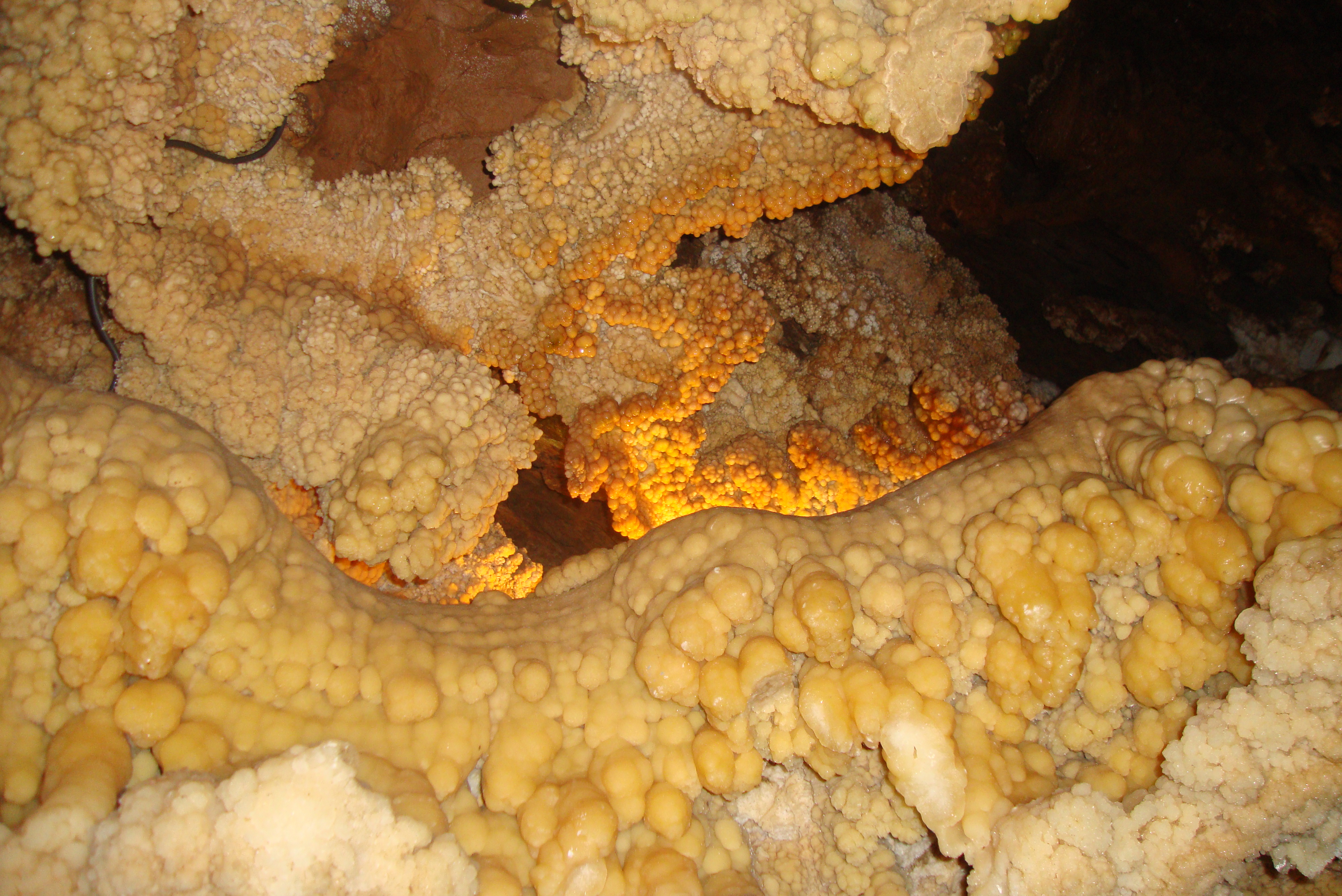
Alisadr Cave, Hamedan, Iran

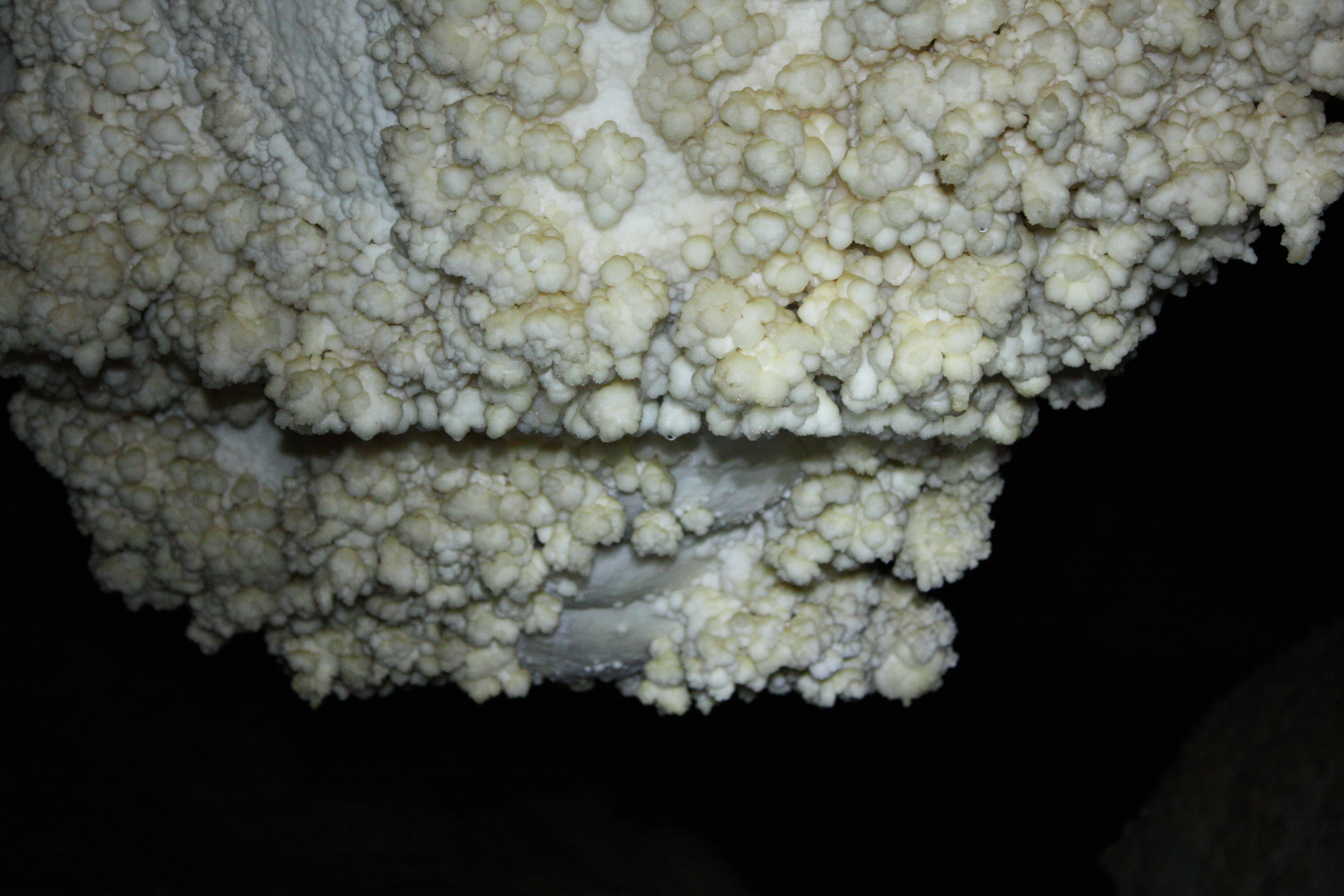
Cave popcorn trays

Diagram of dripstone cave structures (cave popcorn labelled AH)

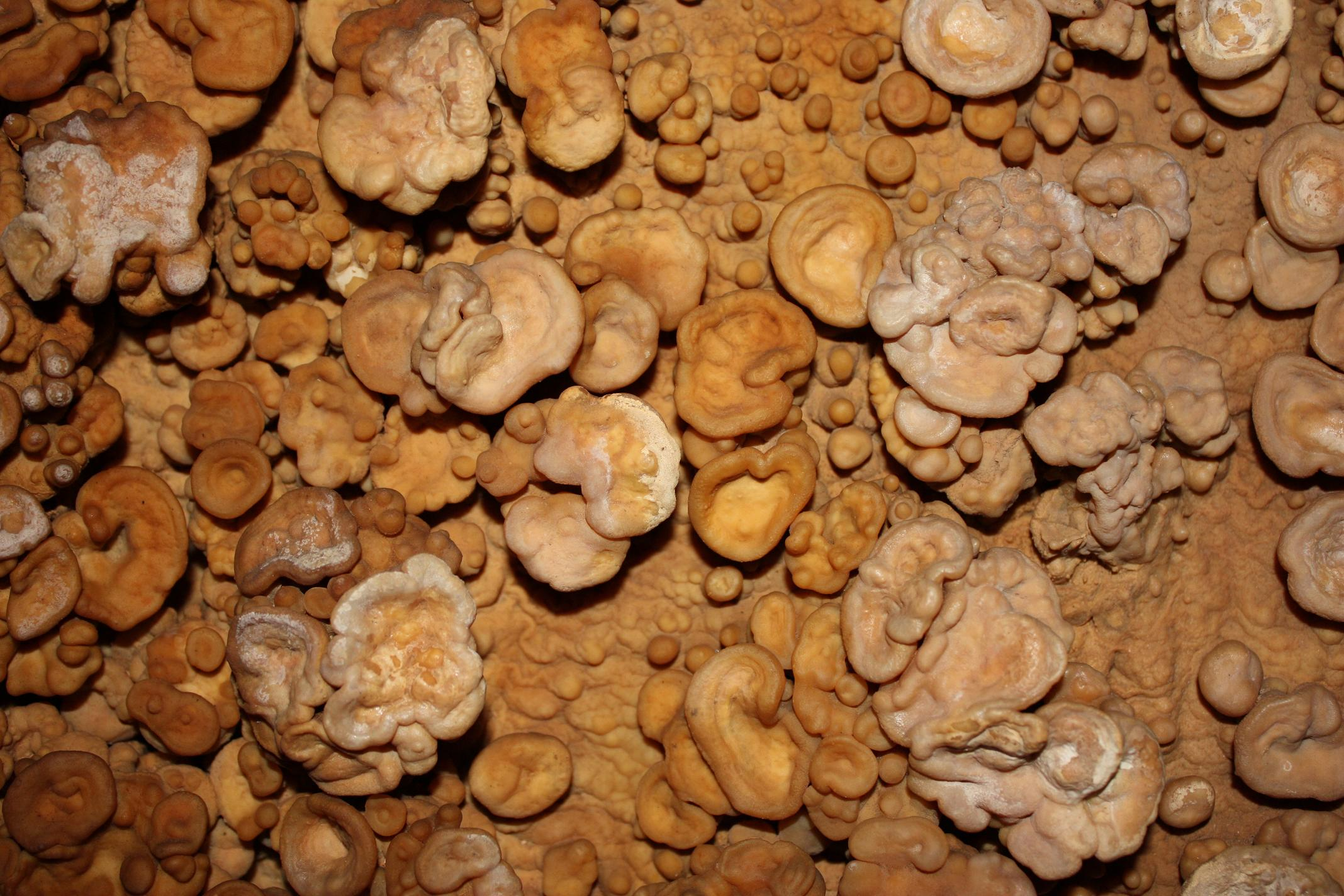
Button cave popcorn

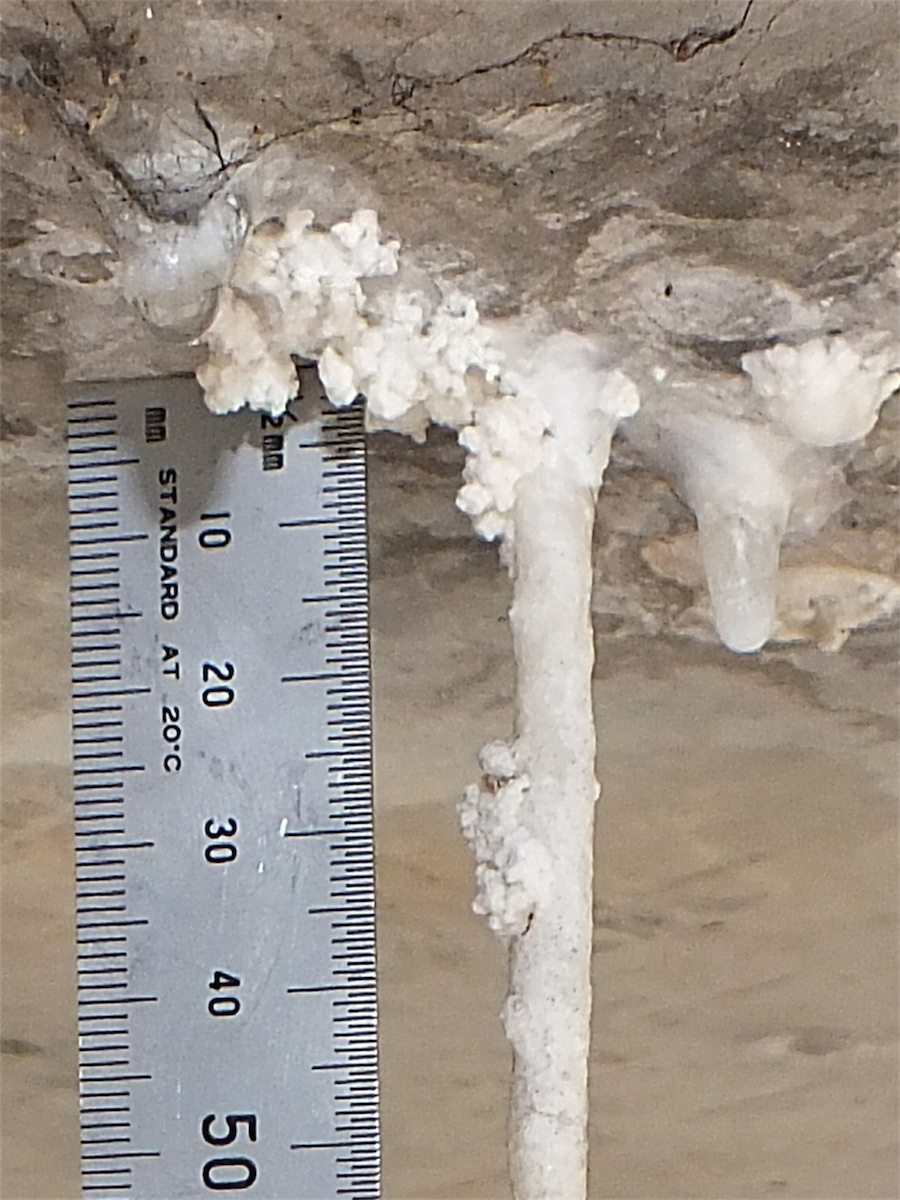
Calthemite coralloids under concrete, with soda straw
