= D1 road (Croatia) =

National highway in Croatia

Coordinates: 46.262°N 15.869499°E

D1 state road

Route information
- Part of
- Length: 421.2 km (261.7 mi)

Major junctions
- From: Macelj border crossing to Slovenia; Slovenian G9 road
- A2 in several interchanges D207 in Đurmanec; D206 in Krapina; D35 in Sveti Križ Začretje; D24 near Zabok; D205 near Zabok; D307 near Zabok; D225 in Zaprešić interchange A3 in a section where D1 and A3 are concurrent A1 in Lučko, Karlovac and Dugopolje interchanges. D3 in Lučko interchange and Karlovac; D310 in Jastrebarsko; D228 in Karlovac; D6 in Karlovac and in Brezova Glava; D36 in Karlovac; D42 in Grabovac; D217 in Ličko Petrovo Selo; D52 near Vrelo Koreničko; D25 in Korenica; D522 near Udbina; D218 in Bruvno; D27 in Gračac; D59 near Knin; D33 in Knin; D219 in Sinj; D60 in Brnaze D56 near Klis
- To: D8 in Split

Location
- Country: Croatia
- Counties: Krapina-Zagorje, Zagreb County, City of Zagreb, Karlovac, Lika-Senj, Zadar, Šibenik-Knin, Split-Dalmatia
- Major cities: Krapina, Zagreb, Karlovac, Slunj, Gračac, Knin, Sinj

Highway system
- Highways in Croatia

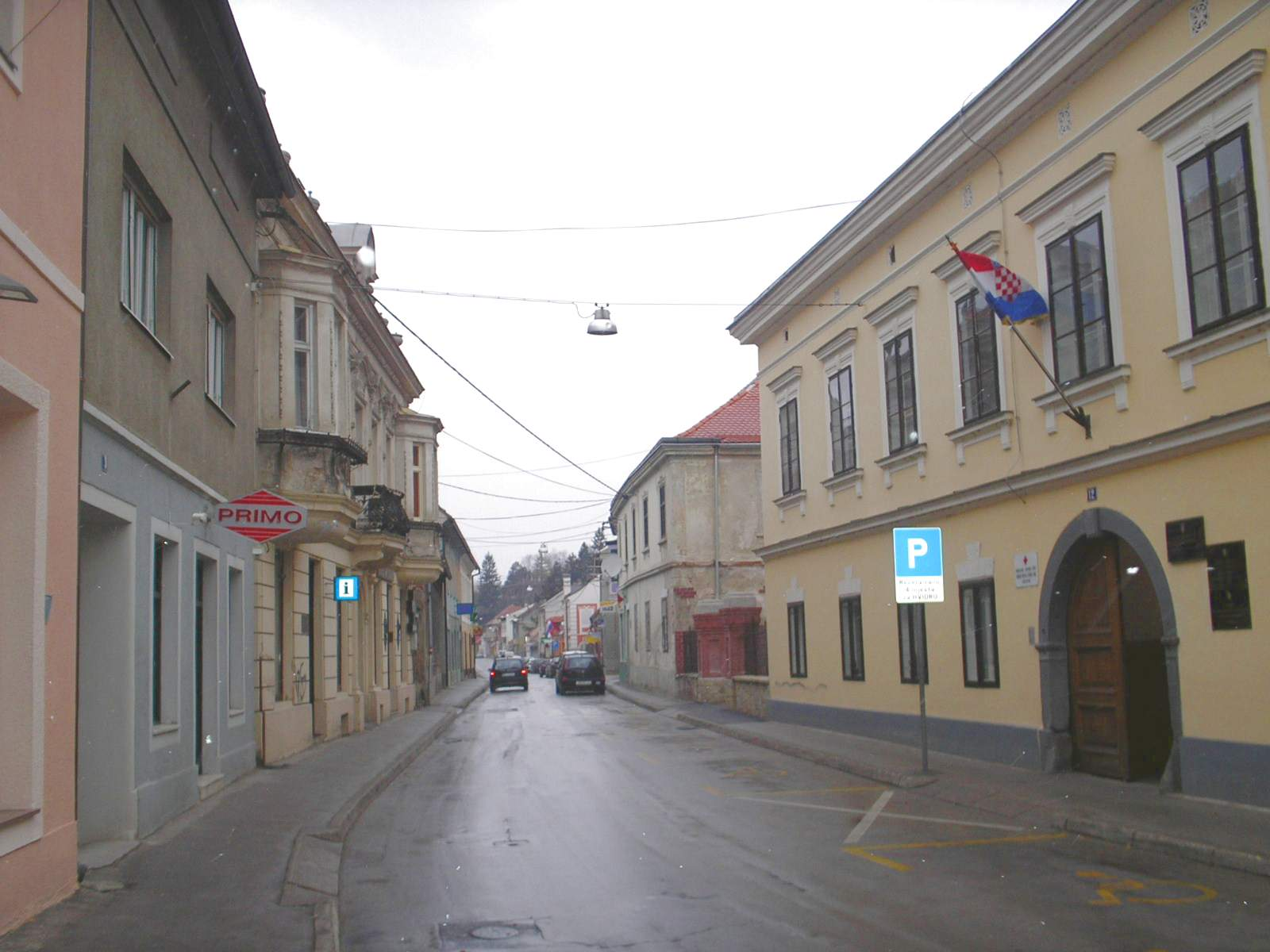
Krapina, on the D1 route

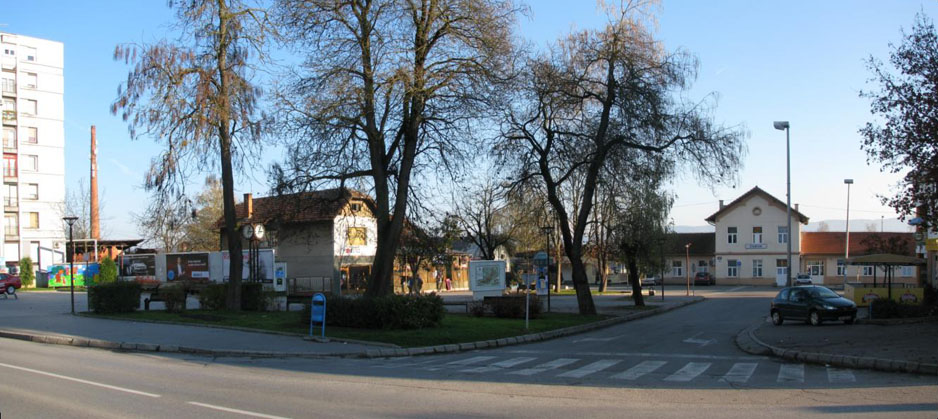
Zabok, on the D1 route

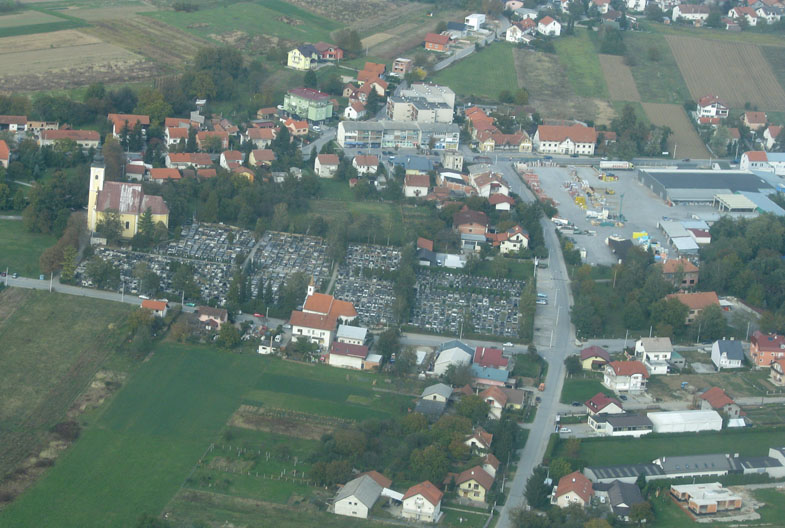
Lučko, on the D1 route

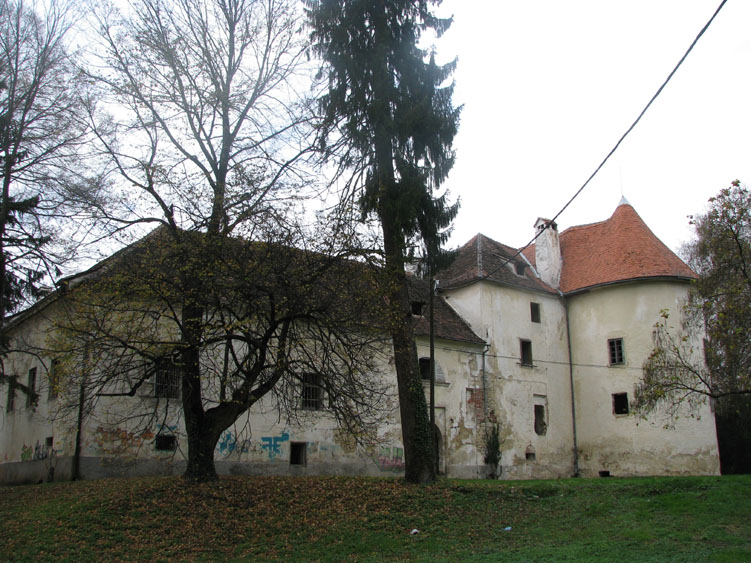
Jastrebarsko, on the D1 route

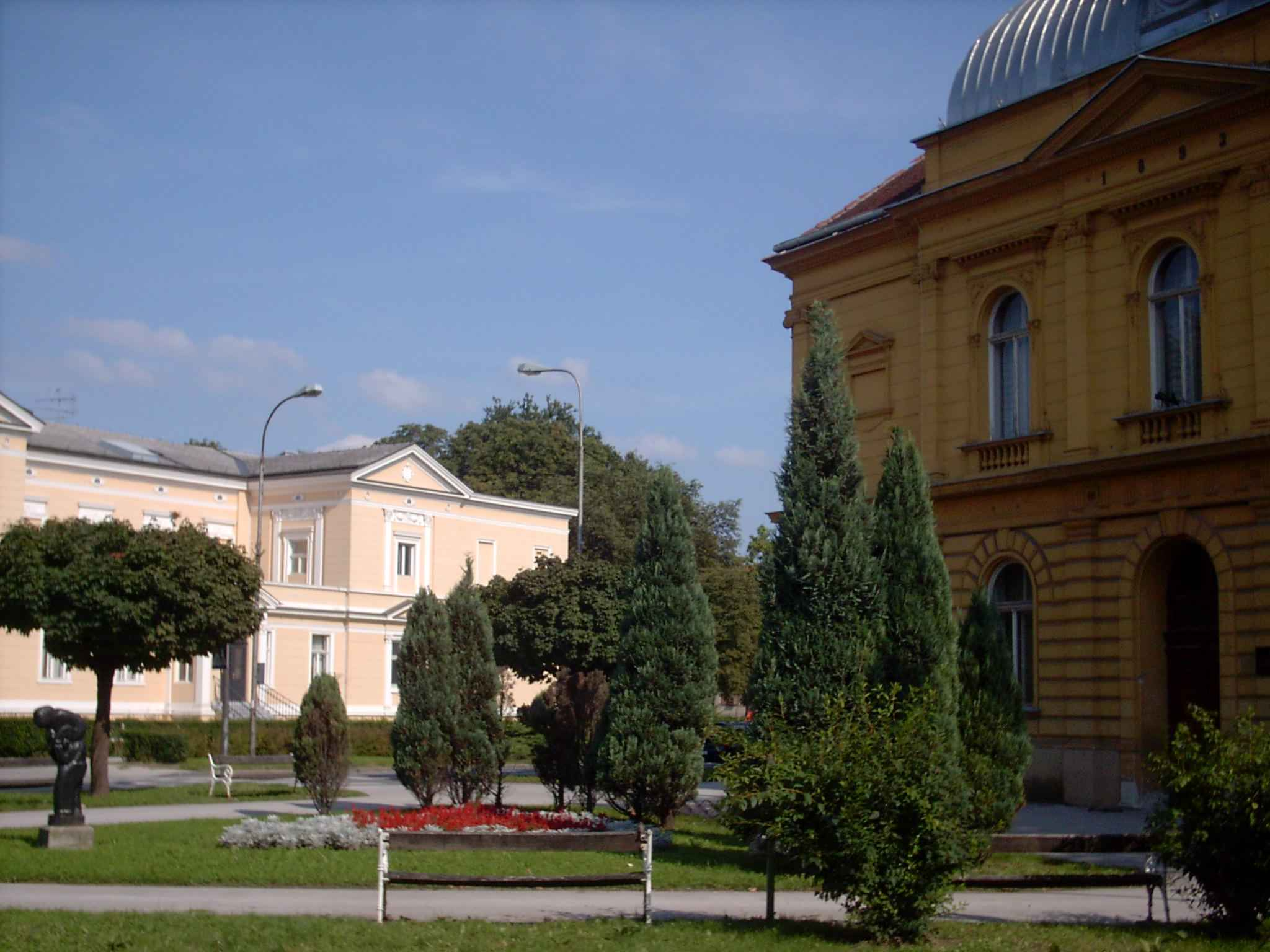
Karlovac, on the D1 route

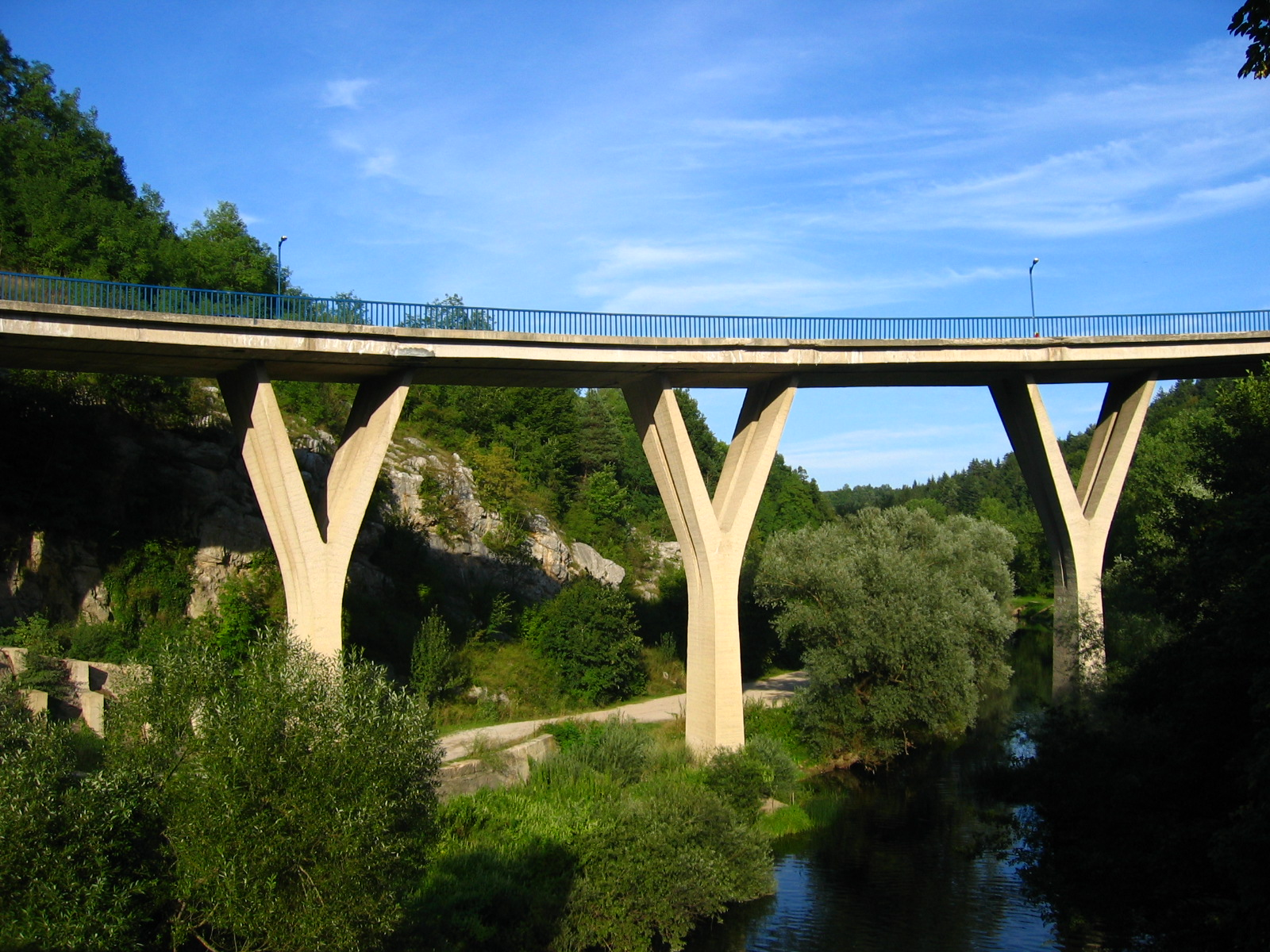
Road bridge north of Slunj, carrying the D1 road

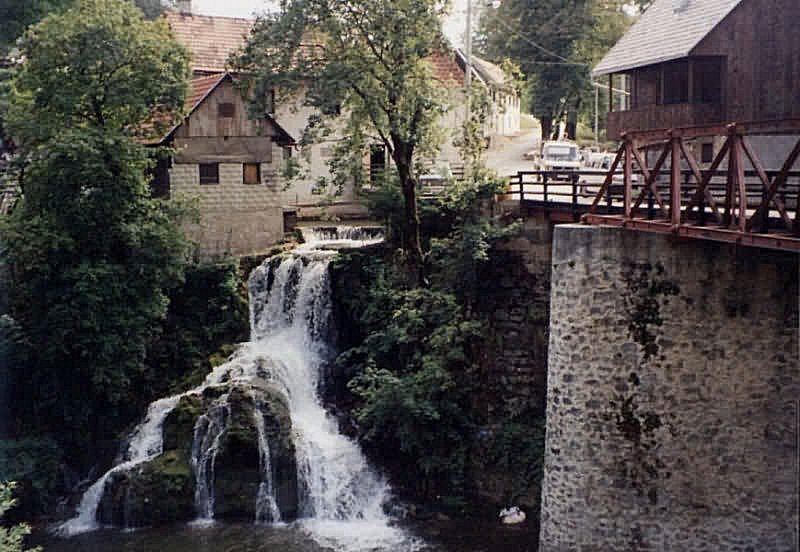
Rastoke, on the D1 route

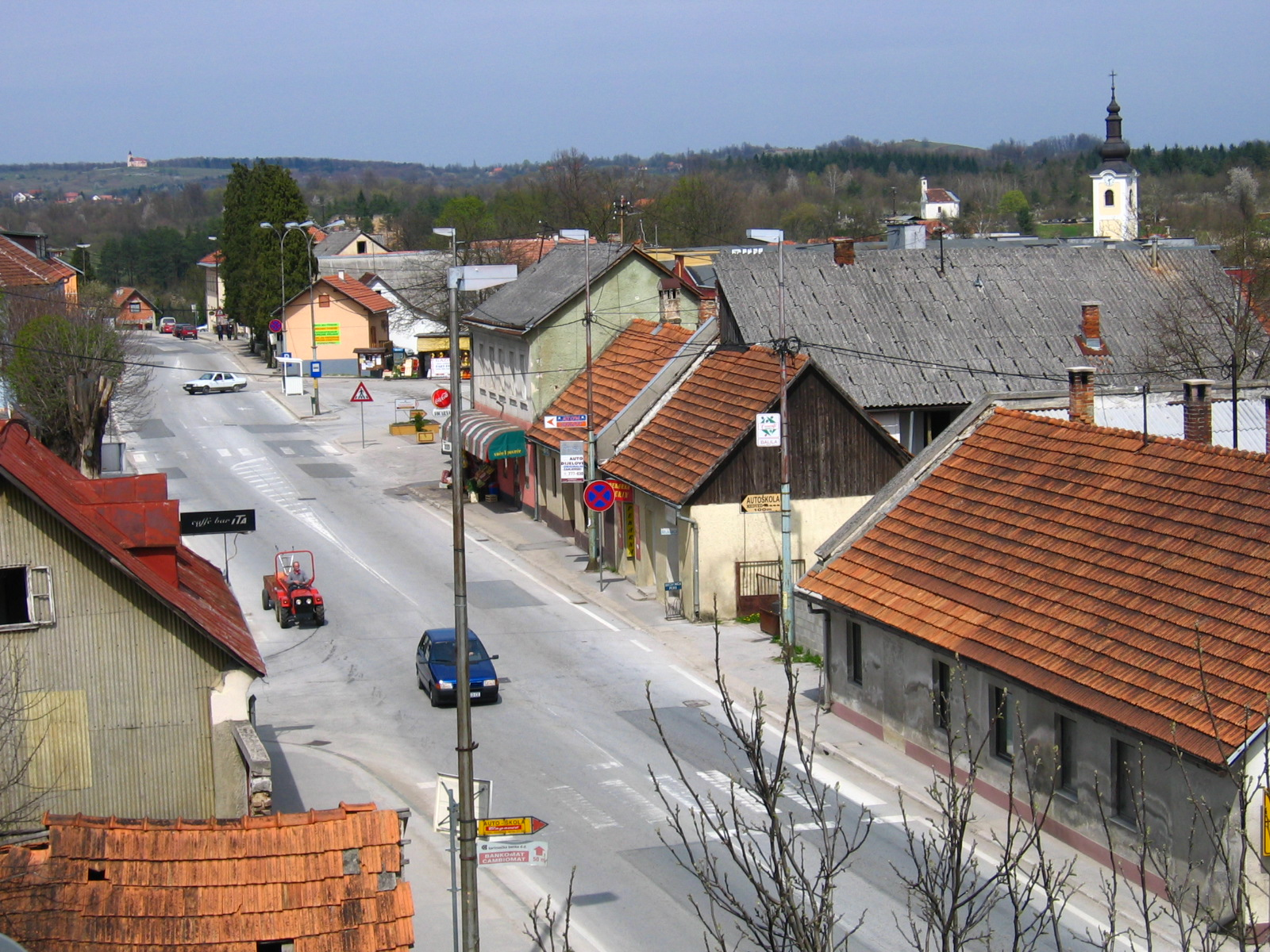
Slunj, on the D1 route

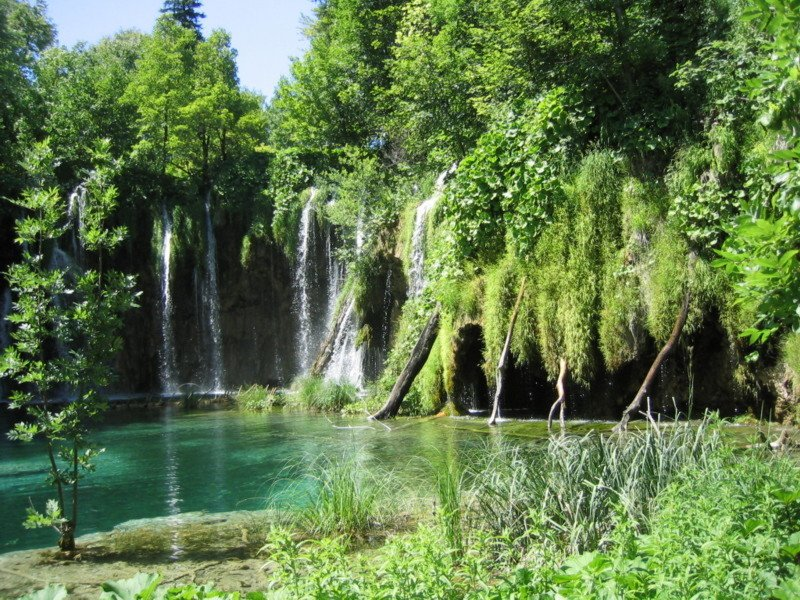
Plitvice Lakes National Park, next to the D1 route

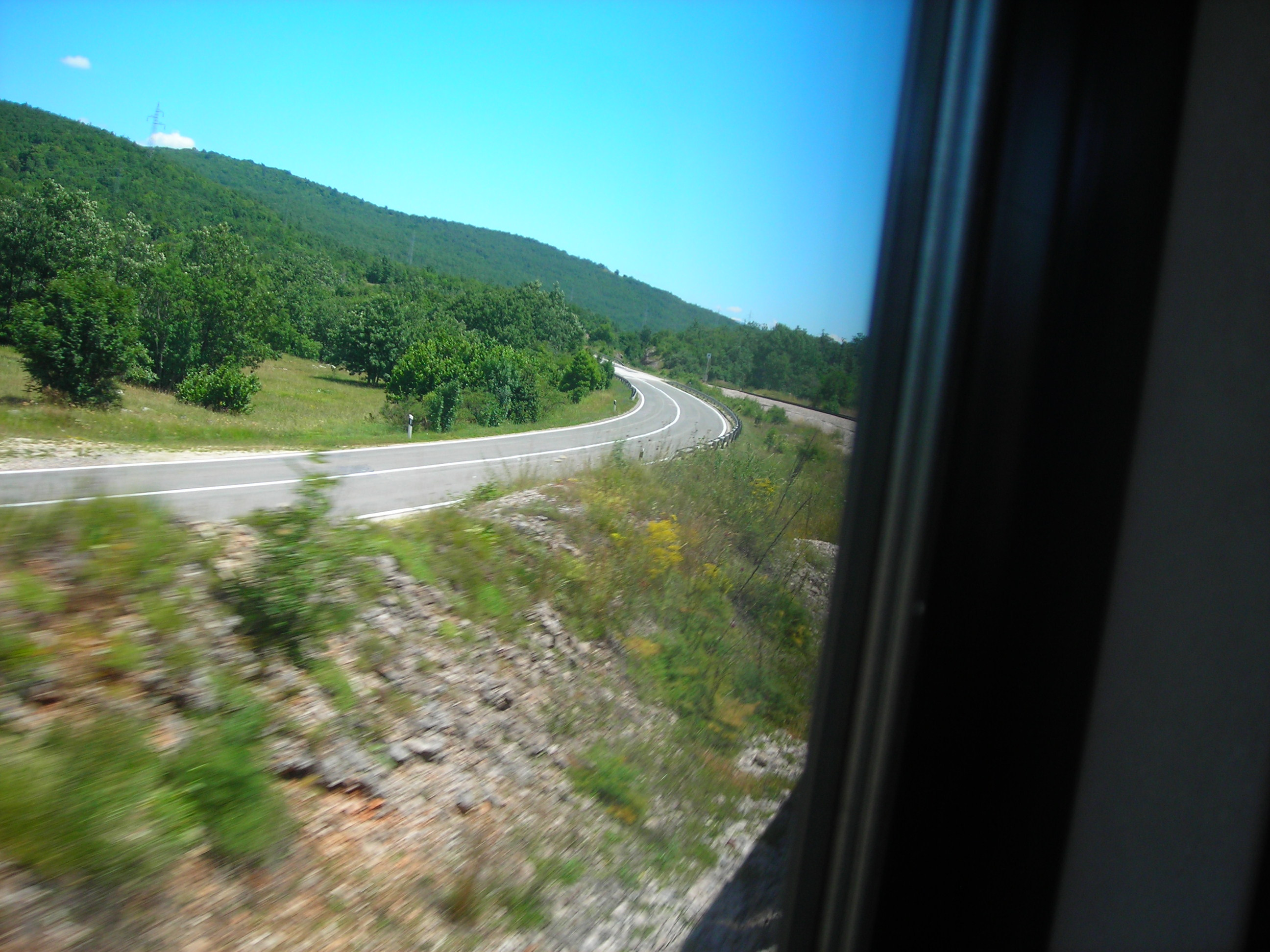
The D1 road near Knin

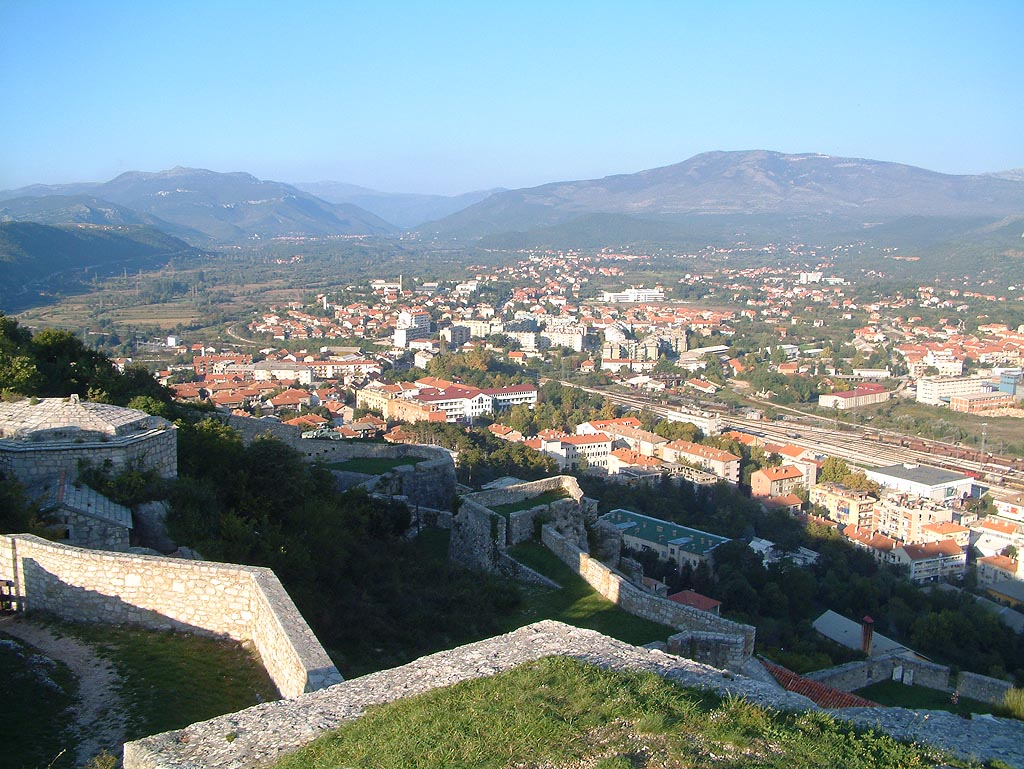
Knin, on the D1 route

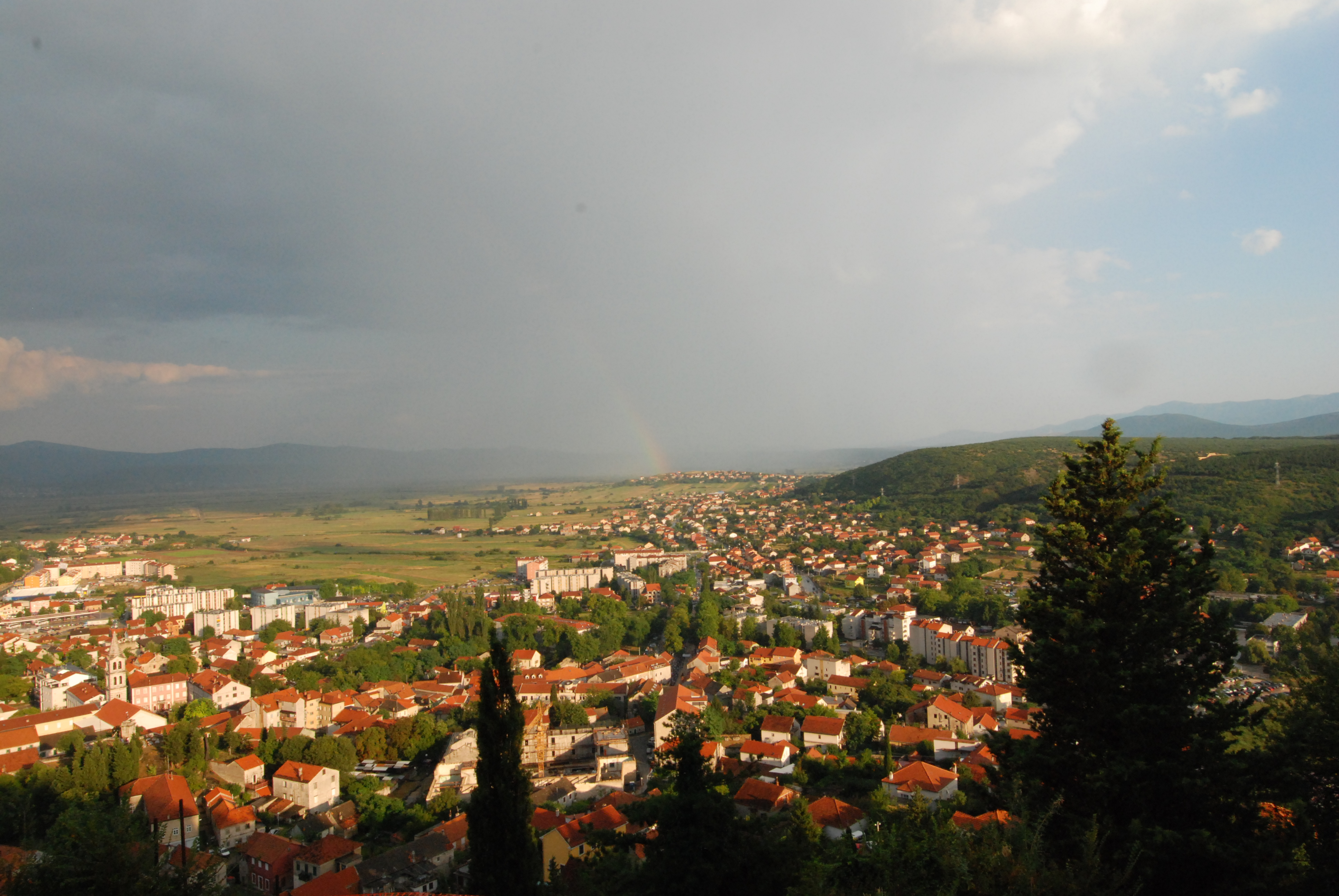
Sinj, on the D1 route

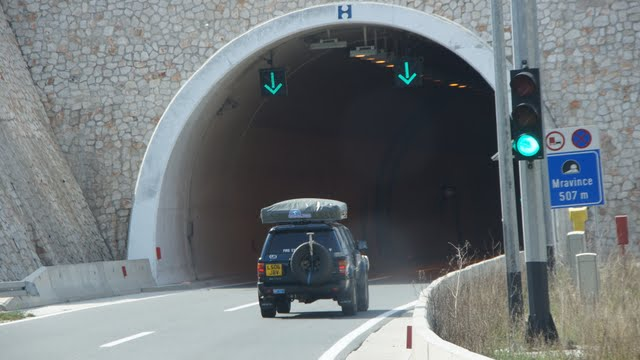
Tunnel Mravince, on the D1 route

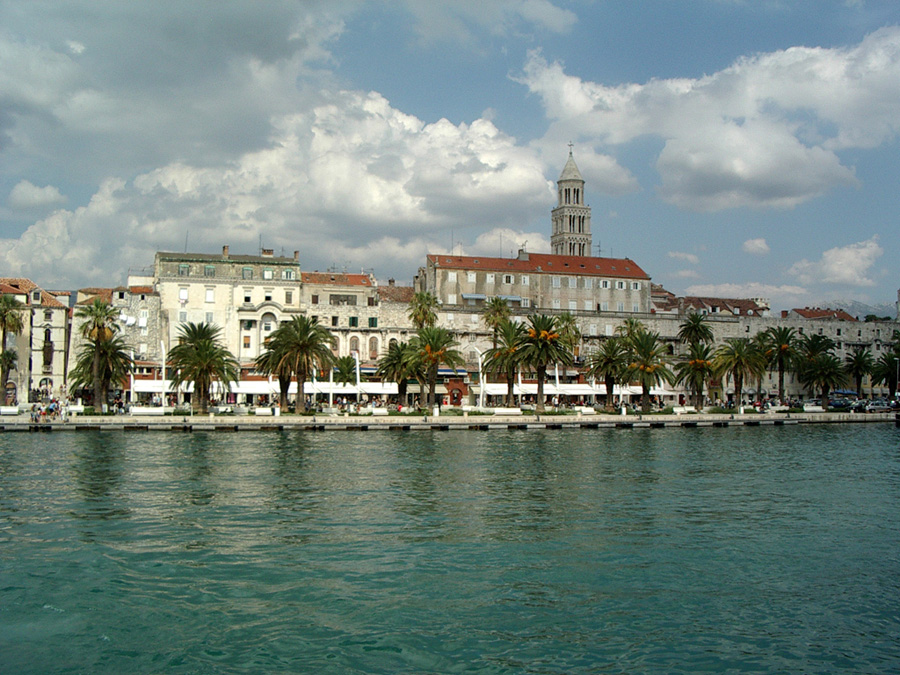
Split, at the D1 road terminus

The state road D1 (Croatian: Državna cesta D1) is a national highway in Croatia. It is a one-lane highway that spans from Macelj border crossing in the north via Krapina, Zagreb, Karlovac, Slunj, Gračac, Knin, Sinj, ending in Split. It is 421.2 kilometres (261.7 mi) long overall.

Before the A1 and A2 dual carriage motorways were completed in 2005 and 2007, respectively, the D1 was probably the busiest road during the summer in Croatia as it connected the northern border as well as the city of Zagreb with the tourist resorts on the Adriatic Sea. Since then, the traffic has waned significantly, but the D1 remains relevant as an alternative to the tolled highways.

== Route description ==
North of Zagreb the D1 is mostly parallel to the A2 motorway up to the Krapina interchange, connecting to a number of the A2 interchanges directly or via connector roads. It also runs parallel with railway tracks in some sections running through hilly terrain.

A part of the D1 state road is concurrent with other routes: the A2 motorway between Zaprešić and Jankomir interchanges, the A3 motorway between Jankomir and Lučko interchanges, the D3 state road between the A3 motorway Lučko interchange and Karlovac, the D6 state road in Karlovac, the D33 state road in Knin and the D219 state road in Sinj.

Parts of the D1 have been upgraded to expressway (brza cesta) status. Currently two sections of the D1 are considered as such, since they comprise dual carriageways or are currently expanded to four traffic lanes:

- an urban expressway in Karlovac, between the A1 motorway Karlovac interchange and Mostanje
- an expressway in and near Split, between the A1 motorway Dugopolje interchange and Bilice roundabout in Split itself

The northern part of the D1 in Karlovac is actually a slightly lower road category because there are several intersections with traffic lights which slow the traffic down.

Parts of the road in Lika have climbing lanes.

The road, as well as all other state roads in Croatia are managed and maintained by Hrvatske ceste, a state-owned company.

== Traffic volume ==
Traffic is regularly counted and reported by Hrvatske ceste, operator of the road. The D1 AADT and ASDT (average summer daily traffic) figure variations observed south of Karlovac are attributed to tourist traffic to various regions of Adriatic Sea coast in Dalmatia region of Croatia.

D1 traffic volume
Road	Counting site	AADT	ASDT	Notes
D1	1101 Macelj	1,623	1,879	Between the Ž2258 and D207 junctions. Average daily traffic figure is provided instead of AADT.
D1	1104 Đurmanec	3,640	4,056	Between the D207 and D206 junctions.
D1	1122 Čveki	4,094	4,168	Between the D35 and Ž2158 junctions.
D1	1927 Veliko Trgovišće	6,406	4,571	Between the D307 and Ž2217 junctions. Average daily traffic figure is provided instead of AADT.
D1	1935 Gornji Stupnik	6,198	7,138	Adjacent to the Ž3061 junction.
D1	1929 Klinča Sela	9,867	11,527	Adjacent to the Ž3106 junction.
D1	1928 Izimje	6,567	8,228	Adjacent to the Ž3102 junction.
D1	3114 Karlovac	21,470	25,076	Between the D228 and D3 junctions. The AADT figure estimated by Hrvatske ceste.
D1	3101 Tušilović	8,350	12,076	Adjacent to the Ž3188 junction.
D1	3105 Blagaj	4,894	8,975	Adjacent to the L34120 junction.
D1	3106 Slunj	5,448	9,605	Adjacent to the Ž3258 junction.
D1	4307 Vaganac	1,896	2,963	Adjacent to the L59024 junction.
D1	4308 Prijeboj - Northeast	1,449	2,349	Adjacent to the Ž5201 junction.
D1	4302 Prijeboj	4,996	9,795	Adjacent to the Ž5201 junction.
D1	4309 Korenica	4,964	9,783	Adjancent to the D52 junction.
D1	4304 Jošan	3,461	7,820	Adjacent to the Ž5195 junction.
D1	4901 Mutilić (Udbina)	1,646	3,083	Adjacent to the L59101 junction. The AADT figure estimated by Hrvatske ceste.
D1	4907 Gračac	1,800	2,647	Adjacent to the D27junction.
D1	5002 Pađene	1,629	2,561	Adjacent to the D59 junction.
D1	5418 Kijevo	1,434	1,920	Between the Ž6058 and Ž6083 junctions.
D1	5524 Sinj	6,437	7,094	Between the Ž6118 and D219 junctions.
D1	5504 Brnaze	8,810	10,341	Adjacent to the D60 junction.
D1	5523 Dugopolje	22,994	29,325	Between A1 and D56 junctions.

== Road junctions and populated areas ==
D1 major junctions/populated areas
Type	Slip roads/Notes
	Macelj border crossing to Slovenia; Slovenian G9 road to Ptuj and Maribor. The northern terminus of the road.
	A2 Trakošćan interchange. Ž2258 to Trakošćan and Bednja (D74).
	Donji Macelj
	A2 Đurmanec interchange (reached via a short connecting road).
	Đurmanec; D207 to Lupinjak and Hum na Sutli (D206).
	Krapina; D206 to Pregrada and Hum na Sutli.
	A2 Krapina interchange (reached via a short connecting road).
	Velika Ves
	Lepajci
	Galovec Začretski
	Švaljkovec; D35 to Lepoglava and Varaždin (D2). Ž2160 to Sveti Križ Začretje, Štrucljevo and Zabok.
	A2 Sveti Križ Začretje interchange.
	Ciglenica Zagorska; Ž2158 to Sveti Križ Začretje and Donja Pačetina. Ž2162 to Brestovec Orehovički.
	Mirkovec; Ž2166 to Bedekovčina (D24).
	Brezova
	Grdenci
	Hum Zabočki; D24 to Zlatar Bistrica, Novi Marof, Varaždinske Toplice and Ludbreg (D2).
	Zabok; Ž2195 to Pavlovec Zabočki, Gubaševo, Veliko Trgovišće, Luka and Pojatno.
	D205 to Gubaševo, Klanjec and Kumrovec.
	D307 to A2 motorway Zabok interchange, Oroslavje, Donja Stubica and Marija Bistrica (D29).
	Veliko Trgovišće interchange Ž2217 to Veliko Trgovišće (to the west) and to Stubička Slatina and Stubičke Toplice (to the east).
	Luka interchange Ž3008 to Luka (to the west) and to Jakovlje and Kraljev Vrh (to the east).
	Ž3009 to Kupljenovo (to the west) and to Jakovlje (to the east).
	Pojatno interchange Ž3036 to Pojatno (to the west) and to Donja Bistra (to the east).
	A2 Zaprešić interchange to Krapina (to the north) and to A3 motorway Jankomir interchange (to the south). D225 to Zagreb via Bologna Alley and to Zaprešić (to the south). To the south, the D1 road and the A2 motorway are concurrent. Northbound D1 traffic leaves the A2 motorway at the interchange.
	Jankomir interchange A2 to Krapina to the north. Northbound D1 traffic follows the A2 to the north. A3 to Samobor and Bregana border crossing to Slovenia to the west. Southbound D1 traffic follows the A3 to the east. To Zagreb via Ljubljanska Avenue. The D1 road is concurrent with the A2 motorway to the north and with the A3 motorway to the east.
	Lučko interchange A1 to Karlovac, Rijeka, Zadar and Split to the south. A3 to eastern parts of Zagreb, Velika Gorica, Bjelovar, Varaždin and Slavonski Brod to the east. D3 to Karlovac - The D1 and the D3 are concurrent south of this junction. To Zagreb via Jadranska Avenue. The D1 road is concurrent with the A3 motorway to the west. Southbound D1 traffic leaves the interchange in direction of Lučko. To the south, the D1 road and the D3 are concurrent.
	Lučko
	Gornji Stupnik; Ž3067 to Donji Stupnik.
	Ž3061 to Kalinovica, Brezje Samoborsko and Sveta Nedjelja.
	Rakov Potok
	Klinča Sela; Ž3106 to Kupinec and Pisarovina (D36).
	Ž3105 to Stankovo.
	Jastrebarsko; D310 to A1 motorway Jastrebarsko interchange. Ž3055 to Donja Reka. Ž3102 to Draga Svetojanska and Hrastje Plešivičko.
	Novaki Petrovinski; Ž3102 to Draga Svetojanska and Hrastje Plešivičko. Ž3103 to Domagović.
	Čeglje
	Ž3101 to Guci Draganički and Brezarić.
	Draganić; Ž3150 to Lazina.
	Lug; Ž3150 to Mahično.
	D228 to Ozalj, Kamanje and Jurovski Brod (D6).
	A1 Karlovac interchange to Zagreb (to the north) and to Rijeka, Zadar and Split (to the south). The interchange is accessed via a short connector.
	The northern terminus of dual carriageway expressway through Karlovac.
	Karlovac; D3 to Duga Resa, Delnice and Rijeka (to the south). The D1 and D3 roads are concurrent to the north of Karlovac. D6 to Netretić and Jurovski Brod. the D1 and D6 roads are concurrent south and east of Karlovac. D36 to Pokupsko, Sisak and A3 motorway Popovača interchange.
	The southern terminus of dual carriageway expressway through Karlovac.
	Mostanje
	Turanj; Ž3186 to Skakavac, Gvozd and Perna.
	Cerovac Vukmanićki
	Tušilović
	Brezova Glava; D6 to Vojnić, Glina and Dvor (to the east). The D1 and D6 roads to the north are concurrent.
	Krnjak; Ž3189 to Barilović. Ž3290 to Kolarić (D216).
	Brebornica
	Donje Taborište
	Rastoke
	Slunj; Ž3256 to Gornje Primišlje, Kamenica Skradnička and D23. Ž3257 to Taborište and Obrovci. Ž3258 to Batnoga, Cetingrad and Pašin Potok. Ž3266 to Donji Furjan, Bogovolja and Cetingrad.
	Slunj Bridge - 141.6 m (465 ft) long, spanning Korana River.
	Broćanac
	Oštarski Stanovi
	Rakovica; Ž3269 to Grabovac Drežnički.
	Grabovac; D42 to Josipdol, Ogulin and Vrbovsko (D3).
	Irinovac
	Drežnik Grad
	Ličko Petrovo Selo; D217 to Ličko Petrovo Selo border crossing to Bosnia and Herzegovina.
	Prijeboj; Ž5201 to Plitvice Lakes National Park and Selište Drežničko (D42).
	D52 to Otočac (D50).
	Vranovača
	Korenica; D25 to Lički Osik and Gospić and Karlobag(D8).
	Gradina Korenička
	Bjelopolje; Ž5169 to Donji Lapac (D218).
	Jošan
	Ž5164 to and Podlapača.
	Ž5195 to Udbina. The road forms another intersection with the D1 road south of Udbina.
	The northern terminus of two-lane expressway (Udbina bypass).
	Udbina interchange D522 to A1 motorway Gornja Ploča interchange.
	The southern terminus of two-lane expressway (Udbina bypass).
	Ž5195 to Udbina.
	Bruvno; D218 to Mazin, Dobroselo and Užljebić border crossing to Bosnia and Herzegovina.
	Gračac; D27 to Obrovac and Benkovac.
	Ž5203 to Srb and Dobroselo (D218).
	Otrić; Ž6033 to Pribudić.
	Ž6025 to Kom, Ervenik, Kaštel Žegarski and Obrovac (D27).
	D59 to Kistanje and Pirovac.
	Ž6034 to Radljevac and Plavno.
	Knin; D33 to Drniš and Šibenik (D8) (to the south). The D1 and D33 roads are concurrent to the south of the D1 route.
	D33 to Strmica border crossing to Bosnia and Herzegovina (to the north). The D1 and D33 roads are concurrent to the north of the D1 route.
	Ž6080 to Kninsko Polje.
	Kovačić; Ž6057 to waterfall Krčić (river Krka).
	Ž6058 to Biskupija, Orlić, Riđane and Zvjerinac.
	Kijevo; Ž6083 to Cetina.
	Vrlika; Ž6082 to Siverić (to the west) and to Bajagić, Otok and D220 (to the east).
	Podosoje
	Ž6101 to Otišić.
	Maljkovo
	Ž6102 to Potravlje.
	Ž6103 to Satrić.
	Hrvace; Ž6105 to Rumin.
	Karakašica; Ž6117 to Lučane. Ž6118 to Čitluk and Jasensko.
	Sinj; D219 to Muć (D56) (to the south) and Bili Brig border crossing to Bosnia and Herzegovina (to the north).
	Brnaze; D60 to Trilj and Imotski.
	Ž6116 to Sičane and Neorić.
	Ž6120 to Kraj.
	Dicmo
	Ž6121 to Prisoje.
	The northern terminus of the urban expressway through Split.
	Podi interchange A1 Dugopolje interchange to Zagreb and Zadar (to the north) and to Ploče interchange (to the south). The interchange is accessed via a short connector. Ž6145 to Dugopolje.
	Klis Grlo interchange D56 to Muć, Klis and Drniš.
	Bilice interchange D8 to Split and also further on to Trogir (to the west) and Stobreč to the east. The D8 state road forms numerous intersections in the city of Split itself. The D8 within the city of Split is also executed as an urban expressway. The southern terminus of the urban expressway through Split and the southern terminus of the road.

== See also ==
- A1 motorway
- A2 motorway
- A3 motorway
