= Sveti Križ Začretje =

- Location within Croatia
- Coordinates: 46°04′48″N 15°54′36″E
- Country: Croatia
- County: Krapina-Zagorje County

Government
  - Mayor: Marko Kos (SDP)

Area
  - Total: 40.2 km^{2} (15.5 sq mi)

Population (2021)
  - Total: 5,659
  - Density: 141/km^{2} (365/sq mi)
- Time zone: UTC+1 (CET)
  - Summer (DST): UTC+2 (CEST)
- Website: sveti-kriz-zacretje.hr

Sveti Križ Začretje is a village and a municipality in the Krapina-Zagorje County, northern Croatia.

== History ==
Sveti Križ Začretje is mentioned in the first list of parishes of the Zagreb Diocese, compiled in 1334 by Archdeacon Ivan of Gorička. In 1233, the Hungarian king Bela IV and his entourage, fleeing from the enemy, got stuck in what is now Bedekovčina. The parish in Sveti Križ Začretje already existed at that time since Bedekovčina belonged to the parish of Sveti Križ Začretje.

In the immediate vicinity of the parish church of the Holy Cross is a late Baroque castle. At the beginning of the 18th century, the castle belonged to the Keglević family. At the beginning of the 18th century, Katarina Keglević was born in the castle who became Patačić upon marriage. She was one of the rare noble poets who wrote poems in the vernacular.

The parish priest Ivan Bradica submitted a request to the Varaždin County Assembly to open a school in 1834. The assembly approved the request and demanded a teacher had to be found and a salary had to be provided. On 13 April 1838 the elementary school began operating. The teacher Oskar Wolfl left a great mark on the settlement. He came to the town in 1913 with a camera and because of this, the school memorial still contains extensive photo documentation. He also opened a new school building on the square in 1914, purchased the first cinema projector and radio in 1924 and established the school bathing area in 1927 with mandatory weekly bathing for children. Thanks to his efforts, the first sanitary well was installed on the square in 1928 and in 1929, he opened a school clinic.

At the beginning of the 21st century, the granary building, built in 1796, was renovated. With the help of the Ministry of Culture of the Republic of Croatia, the Granary Museum was opened.

== Demographics ==
In the 2021 census, there were a total of 5,659 inhabitants of the area, in the following settlements:

- Brezova, population 300
- Ciglenica Zagorska, population 551
- Donja Pačetina, population 661
- Dukovec, population 219
- Galovec Začretski, population 260
- Klupci Začretski, population 77
- Komor Začretski, population 149
- Kotarice, population 112
- Kozjak Začretski, population 189
- Mirkovec, population 457
- Pustodol Začretski, population 193
- Sekirišće, population 328
- Sveti Križ Začretje, population 922
- Štrucljevo, population 321
- Švaljkovec, population 313
- Temovec, population 210
- Vrankovec, population 224
- Završje Začretsko, population 33
- Zleć, population 140

In the same census, the absolute majority of the population were Croats at 98.99%.

Sveti Križ Začretje: Population trends 1857–2021
v

population	3793	4358	4886	5340	5662	6159	6020	6786	6898	6896	6892	6820	6825	6650	6619	6165	5659
	1857	1869	1880	1890	1900	1910	1921	1931	1948	1953	1961	1971	1981	1991	2001	2011	2021

Sources: Croatian Bureau of Statistics publications

== Administration ==
The current mayor of Sveti Križ Začretje is Marko Kos and the Sveti Križ Začretje Municipal Council consists of 13 seats.

Groups	Councilors per group
SDP-HNS-HSS-ZDS	6 / 13
HDZ-HSU	5 / 13
Independents	2 / 13

== Notable people ==
- Katarina Patačić, Croatian countess and poet
