= D504 road =

Road in Croatia

D504 state road

Route information
- Length: 9.9 km (6.2 mi)

Major junctions
- From: D217 in Ličko Petrovo Selo
- To: D1 in Prijeboj

Location
- Country: Croatia
- Counties: Lika-Senj

Highway system
- Highways in Croatia

D504 is a state road in Lika region of Croatia connecting the D1 state road to Ličko Petrovo Selo border crossing to Bihać, Bosnia and Herzegovina via the D217 state road. The road is 9.9 km (6.2 mi) long.

The D504, like all state roads in Croatia, is managed and maintained by Hrvatske ceste, state owned company.

== Traffic volume ==
Traffic is regularly counted and reported by Hrvatske ceste, operator of the road. Substantial seasonal variations of the traffic volume is attributed to summer tourist traffic.

D504 traffic volume
| Road | Counting site | AADT | ASDT | Notes |
| D504 | 4308 Prijeboj - northeast | 1,616 | 2,523 | Adjacent to the D1 junction. |

== Road junctions and populated areas ==
D504 junctions/populated areas
| Type | Slip roads/Notes |
| | Ličko Petrovo Selo; D217 to Grabovac and the D1 state road (to the west) and to Ličko Petrovo Selo border crossing to Bihać, Bosnia and Herzegovina. The eastern terminus of the road. |
| | Zaklopača |
| | Prijeboj; D1 to Karlovac, Slunj and Plitvice Lakes National Park (to the north) and to Udbina and Knin (to the south). The western terminus of the road. |

== See also ==
- State roads in Croatia
- Hrvatske ceste
