= Velika Ves =

Velika Ves or Veliká Ves may refer to places:

== Croatia ==
- Velika Ves, Croatia, a village near Krapina

== Czech Republic ==
- Veliká Ves (Chomutov District), a municipality and village in the Ústí nad Labem Region
- Veliká Ves (Prague-East District), a municipality and village in the Central Bohemian Region
