= Mala Gorica =

Mala Gorica may refer to:

- Mala Gorica, Sisak-Moslavina County, a village near Petrinja
- Mala Gorica, Zagreb County, a village near Sveta Nedelja
