= Novo Selo Koreničko =

- Village
- Interactive map of Novo Selo Koreničko
- Location within Croatia
- Coordinates: 44.87030°N 15.71999°E
- Country: Croatia
- County: Lika-Senj
- Municipality: Plitvička Jezera

Area
  - Total: 2.35 sq mi (6.09 km^{2})

Population (2021)
  - Total: 16
  - Density: 6.8/sq mi (2.6/km^{2})
- Time zone: UTC+1 (CET)
  - Summer (DST): UTC+2 (CEST)

Novo Selo Koreničko is a village in Plitvička Jezera, Croatia. It is connected by the D504 road. It is located only a few miles west of the Bosnia and Herzegovina–Croatia border.

== History ==
Novo Selo Koreničko contains an archaeological heritage site named Abdić brdo, which is the site of a 17th-century Ottoman house.

== See also ==
- List of archaeological heritage sites in Plitvička Jezera
