= D207 road =

State road in northwestern Croatia

D207 state road

Route information
- Length: 14.5 km (9.0 mi)

Major junctions
- From: D206 in Hum na Sutli
- To: D1 in Đurmanec

Location
- Country: Croatia
- Counties: Krapina-Zagorje
- Major cities: Đurmanec

Highway system
- Highways in Croatia

D207 is a state road in Hrvatsko Zagorje region of Croatia connecting Hum na Sutli border crossing to Slovenia to the city of Đurmanec and the A2 motorway Đurmanec interchange via D1 state road. The road is 14.5 km (9.0 mi) long.

The road, as well as all other state roads in Croatia, is managed and maintained by Hrvatske ceste, state owned company.

== Traffic volume ==
Traffic is regularly counted and reported by Hrvatske ceste, the operator of the road.

D207 traffic volume
Road	Counting site	AADT	ASDT	Notes
D207	1124 Hromec	2,308	2,666	Adjacent to the Ž2096 junction.

== Road junctions and populated areas ==
D207 junctions/populated areas
Type	Slip roads/Notes
	Hum na Sutli; D206 to Hum na Sutli border crossing and Pregrada. The western terminus of the road.
	Hum na Sutli; D207 to Đurmanec (D1).
	Ž2095 to Klenovec Humski.
	Lupinjak
	Hromec
	Đurmanec; D1 to Macelj border crossing (to the north) and to the A2 motorway Đurmanec interchange and to Krapina (to the south). Ž2096 to Podbrezovica and Pregrada (D206); Ž2098 to Krapina (D206) and to Popovec (D1). The eastern terminus of the road.
