= Donji Vaganac =

Coordinates: 44°55′N 15°44′E

- Village
- Interactive map of Donji Vaganac
- Country: Croatia
- County: Lika-Senj
- Municipality: Plitvička Jezera

Area
  - Total: 7.5 km^{2} (2.9 sq mi)

Population (2021)
  - Total: 37
  - Density: 4.9/km^{2} (13/sq mi)
- Time zone: UTC+1 (CET)
  - Summer (DST): UTC+2 (CEST)

Donji Vaganac is a village in Plitvička Jezera, Croatia. It is connected by the D217 highway.

== History ==
Donji Vaganac contains an archaeological heritage site named Crkvina, which is a site of the remains of medieval church.

== Notable people ==
- Milica Jurić

== See also ==
- List of archaeological heritage sites in Plitvička Jezera
