= Gornji Vaganac =

- Village
- Interactive map of Gornji Vaganac
- Location within Croatia
- Coordinates: 44.91031°N 15.71085°E
- Country: Croatia
- County: Lika-Senj
- Municipality: Plitvička Jezera

Area
  - Total: 1.47 sq mi (3.81 km^{2})

Population (2021)
  - Total: 87
  - Density: 59/sq mi (23/km^{2})
- Time zone: UTC+1 (CET)
  - Summer (DST): UTC+2 (CEST)

Gornji Vaganac is a village in Plitvička Jezera, Croatia. It is connected by the D1 road.

== History ==
Gornji Vaganac contains an archaeological heritage site named Kukuruzovićeva gradina i pećina, which is a site of a settlement dating to the 1st-2nd century.

== See also ==
- List of archaeological heritage sites in Plitvička Jezera
