= Tuk Bjelopoljski =

- Village
- Interactive map of Tuk Bjelopoljski
- Location within Croatia
- Coordinates: 44.703°N 15.727°E
- Country: Croatia
- County: Lika-Senj
- Municipality: Plitvička Jezera

Area
  - Total: 2.92 sq mi (7.55 km^{2})

Population (2021)
  - Total: 17
  - Density: 5.8/sq mi (2.3/km^{2})
- Time zone: UTC+1 (CET)
  - Summer (DST): UTC+2 (CEST)

Tuk Bjelopoljski is a village in Plitvička Jezera, Croatia. It is connected by the D1 road.

== History ==
Tuk Bjelopoljski contains multiple archaeological heritage sites such as Galovac, the site of a medieval hillfort settlement, and Svinjar, the site of a Japodian hillfort.

== See also ==
- List of archaeological heritage sites in Plitvička Jezera
