= Rakitje =

- Village
- Location within Croatia
- Coordinates: 45°48′N 15°49′E
- Country: Croatia
- County: Zagreb County
- Municipality: Sveta Nedelja

Area
  - Total: 5.0 km^{2} (1.9 sq mi)

Population (2021)
  - Total: 2,239
  - Density: 450/km^{2} (1,200/sq mi)
- Time zone: UTC+1 (CET)
  - Summer (DST): UTC+2 (CEST)

Rakitje is a village in central Croatia located west of Zagreb. County road Ž3064 connects it to the D1 highway.
