= Zaklopača =

Zaklopača may refer to:

- Zaklopača (Grocka), a suburb of Belgrade, Serbia
- Zaklopača (Kraljevo), a village in Serbia
- Zaklopača, Bosnia and Herzegovina, the location of Zaklopača massacre
- Zaklopača, Croatia, a village in Lika, Croatia
