= Jakovlje =

- Municipality
- Općina Jakovlje
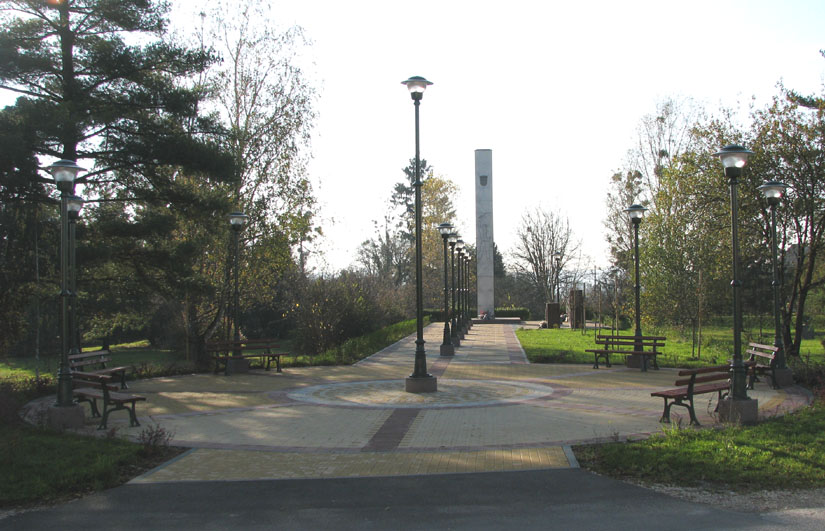
- Jakovlje

- Location of Jakovlje in Croatia
- Coordinates: 45°57′N 15°51′E
- Country: Croatia
- Region: Central Croatia
- County: Zagreb County
- Settlements: 3 settlements: Igrišće; Jakovlje (seat); Kraljev Vrh

Government
  - Mayor: Sanja Borovec

Area
  - Municipality: 35.7 km^{2} (13.8 sq mi)
  - Urban: 18.6 km^{2} (7.2 sq mi)

Population (2021)
  - Municipality: 3,797
  - Density: 106/km^{2} (275/sq mi)
  - Urban: 2,557
  - Urban density: 137/km^{2} (356/sq mi)
- Time zone: UTC+1 (CET)
  - Summer (DST): UTC+2 (CEST)
- Postal codes: 10297
- Area code: 385 01
- License plates: ZG
- Website: jakovlje.hr

Jakovlje is a municipality in Croatia, in Zagreb County.

In the 2011 census there were 3,930 inhabitants, in three settlements:

- Igrišće, population 731
- Jakovlje, population 2,572
- Kraljev Vrh, population 627

In the same census, a majority of the population were Croats.
