= Trnavac, Croatia =

Trnavac
- Village
- Interactive map of Trnavac
- Location within Croatia
- Coordinates: 44.75113°N 15.563644°E
- Country: Croatia
- County: Lika-Senj
- Municipality: Plitvička Jezera

Area
  - Total: 5.12 sq mi (13.26 km^{2})

Population (2021)
  - Total: 4
  - Density: 0.78/sq mi (0.30/km^{2})
- Time zone: UTC+1 (CET)
  - Summer (DST): UTC+2 (CEST)

Trnavac is a village in Plitvička Jezera, Croatia. It is connected by the D52 road.

== History ==
Trnavac contains multiple archaeological heritage sites such as Crkvina, the site of a medieval church, Kulina, the site of a 17th-century Turkish tower, and Gradina, which is the site of a hillfort settlement.

== See also ==
- List of archaeological heritage sites in Plitvička Jezera
