= Novaki Petrovinski =

- Village
- Location within Croatia
- Coordinates: 45°42′00″N 15°37′05″E
- Country: Croatia
- County: Zagreb County

Area
  - Total: 1.8 km^{2} (0.69 sq mi)

Population (2021)
  - Total: 272
  - Density: 150/km^{2} (390/sq mi)
- Time zone: UTC+1 (CET)
  - Summer (DST): UTC+2 (CEST)

Novaki Petrovinski is a village in Croatia. It is connected by the D1 highway.
