= Brezova, Croatia =

Brezova
- Village
- Location within Croatia
- Coordinates: 46.05178°N 15.926203°E
- Country: Croatia
- County: Krapina-Zagorje County
- Municipality: Sveti Križ Začretje

Area
  - Total: 2.4 km^{2} (0.93 sq mi)

Population (2021)
  - Total: 300
  - Density: 120/km^{2} (320/sq mi)
- Time zone: UTC+1 (CET)
  - Summer (DST): UTC+2 (CEST)

Brezova is a village in Croatia. It is connected by the D1 highway.
