= Žitarka =

- Settlement
- Location within Croatia
- Coordinates: 45.8°N 15.8°E
- Country: Croatia
- County: Zagreb
- City: Sveta Nedelja

Area
  - Total: 1.0 km^{2} (0.39 sq mi)

Population (2021)
  - Total: 262
  - Density: 260/km^{2} (680/sq mi)
- Time zone: UTC+1 (CET)
  - Summer (DST): UTC+2 (CEST)

Žitarka is a settlement (naselje) in the Sveta Nedelja administrative territory of Zagreb County, Croatia. As of 2011 it had a population of 239 people.
