= D310 road =

Road in Croatia

D310 state road

Route information
- Length: 3.7 km (2.3 mi)

Major junctions
- From: D1 in Jastrebarsko
- To: A1 in Jastrebarsko interchange

Location
- Country: Croatia
- Counties: Zagreb
- Major cities: Jastrebarsko

Highway system
- Highways in Croatia

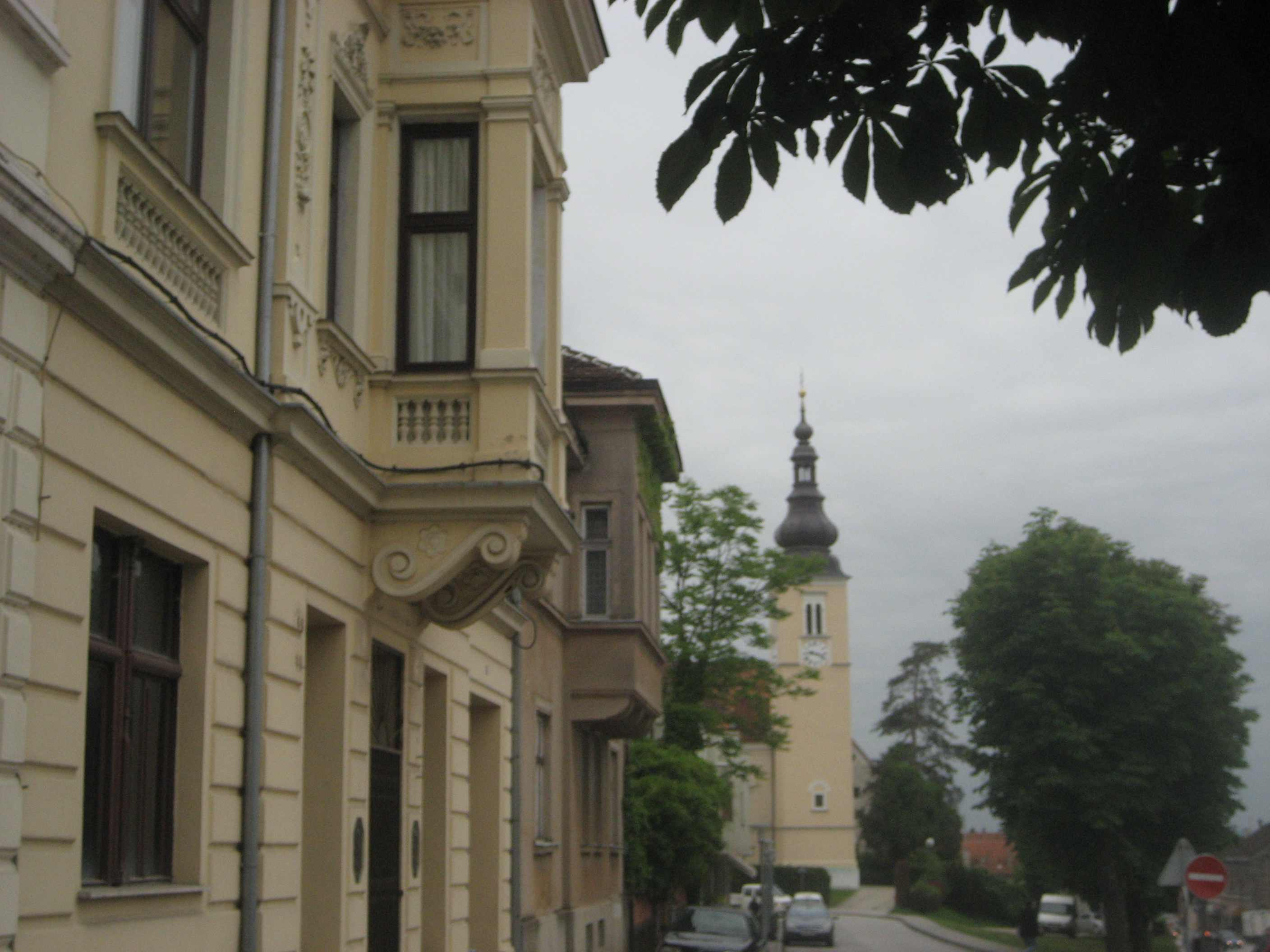
Jastrebarsko, at the starting terminus of D310

D310 connects the A1 motorway Jastrebarsko interchange to the city of Jastrebarsko itself. The road is 3.7 km (2.3 mi) long. The route comprises a significant number of urban intersections, in the segment of the road running through Jastrebarsko.

The road and indeed all state roads in Croatia are managed and maintained by Hrvatske ceste, state owned company.

== Traffic volume ==
The D310 state road traffic volume is not reported by Hrvatske ceste, however they regularly count and report traffic volume on the A1 motorway Jastrebarsko interchange, which connects to the D310 road only, thus permitting the D310 road traffic volume to be accurately calculated. The report includes no information on ASDT volumes.

D310 traffic volume
Road	Counting site	AADT	ASDT	Notes
A1	Jastrebarsko interchange	1,605	n/a	Southbound A1 traffic leaving the motorway at the interchange.
A1	Jastrebarsko interchange	363	n/a	Southbound A1 traffic entering the motorway at the interchange.
A1	Jastrebarsko interchange	447	n/a	Northbound A1 traffic leaving the motorway at the interchange.
A1	Jastrebarsko interchange	1,472	n/a	Northbound A1 traffic entering the motorway at the interchange.
D310	Jastrebarsko interchange	3,887	n/a	Total traffic entering/leaving the A1 motorway from/to D310.

== Road junctions and populated areas ==
D310 junctions/populated areas
Type	Slip roads/Notes
	Jastrebarsko; D1 to Zagreb (to the north) and Karlovac (to the south). The western terminus of the road.
	L31139 to Cvetković.
	A1 in Jastrebarsko interchange, to Zagreb (to the north) and to Rijeka and Split (to the south). The eastern terminus of the road.

== See also ==
- A1 motorway
