= Grdenci =

- Village
- Location within Croatia
- Coordinates: 46°02′10″N 15°55′44″E
- Country: Croatia
- County: Krapina-Zagorje County
- Municipality: Zabok

Area
  - Total: 2.3 km^{2} (0.89 sq mi)

Population (2021)
  - Total: 439
  - Density: 190/km^{2} (490/sq mi)
- Time zone: UTC+1 (CET)
  - Summer (DST): UTC+2 (CEST)

Grdenci is a village in Croatia. It is connected by the D1 highway.
