= Melinovac =

Melinovac Мелиновац (Serbian)
- Village
- Interactive map of Melinovac
- Location within Croatia
- Coordinates: 44°44′27″N 15°53′58″E
- Country: Croatia
- County: Lika-Senj
- Municipality: Donji Lapac

Area
  - Total: 21.0 km^{2} (8.1 sq mi)
- Elevation: 430 m (1,410 ft)

Population (2021)
  - Total: 0
  - Density: 0.0/km^{2} (0.0/sq mi)
- Time zone: UTC+1 (CET)
  - Summer (DST): UTC+2 (CEST)
- Postal code: 53251 Nebljusi
- Area code: +385 (53)

Melinovac (Serbian Cyrillic: Мелиновац) is a village in Croatia.

== History ==
During World War II, as part of their genocide targeting ethnic Serbs, the Croatian fascist Ustaše regime killed about 890 Serbs from Melinovac as well as the nearby village of Ličko Petrovo Selo between June and August 1941. The victims were thrown into a pit.

== Population ==
In the 2011 census, Melinovac had 9 inhabitants. In the 2021 census, it had no inhabitants.

Melinovac: Population trends 1857–2021
v

population	170	260	313	337	326	337	331	324	191	229	162	121	66	43	4	9
	1857	1869	1880	1890	1900	1910	1921	1931	1948	1953	1961	1971	1981	1991	2001	2011	2021

Sources: Croatian Bureau of Statistics publications

=== 1991 census ===
According to the 1991 census, settlement of Melinovac had 43 inhabitants, which were ethnically declared as this:

Melinovac
1991
total: 43
1. Serbs 42 (97.7%)
2. Greeks 1 (2.32%)

=== Austro-hungarian 1910 census ===
According to the 1910 census, settlement of Melinovac had 337 inhabitants which were linguistically and religiously declared as this:

Population by language	Croatian or Serbian
Melinovac	337
Total	337 (100%)

Population by religion	Eastern Orthodox	Roman Catholics
Melinovac	330	7
Total	330 (97.92%)	7 (2.07%)

== Literature ==
- Savezni zavod za statistiku i evidenciju FNRJ i SFRJ, popis stanovništva 1948, 1953, 1961, 1971, 1981. i 1991. godine.
- Knjiga: "Narodnosni i vjerski sastav stanovništva Hrvatske, 1880-1991: po naseljima, author: Jakov Gelo, izdavač: Državni zavod za statistiku Republike Hrvatske, 1998., ISBN 953-6667-07-X, ISBN 978-953-6667-07-9;
