= Brestovec Orehovički =

- Village
- Location within Krapina-Zagorje County Location within Croatia
- Coordinates: 46.079304°N 15.982533°E
- Country: Croatia
- Region: Hrvatsko Zagorje
- County: Krapina-Zagorje County
- Municipality: Bedekovčina

Area
  - Total: 15,000 km^{2} (5,800 sq mi)
- Elevation: 140 m (460 ft)

Population (2021)
  - Total: 305
  - Density: 0.020/km^{2} (0.053/sq mi)
- Time zone: UTC+1 (CET)
  - Summer (DST): UTC+2 (CEST)
- Postal code: 49228
- Area code: 049

Brestovec Orehovički is a village in Hrvatsko Zagorje region of Croatia. The settlement is administered as a part of Krapina-Zagorje County, Bedekovčina municipality. It is connected by the Ž2162 county road, which in turn connects to the D1 state road.

According to the 2011 census, the village has 334 inhabitants.
