= Jagnjić Dol =

- Settlement
- Location within Croatia
- Country: Croatia
- County: Zagreb
- City: Sveta Nedelja

Area
  - Total: 1.9 km^{2} (0.73 sq mi)

Population (2021)
  - Total: 468
  - Density: 250/km^{2} (640/sq mi)
- Time zone: UTC+1 (CET)
  - Summer (DST): UTC+2 (CEST)

Jagnjić Dol is a settlement (naselje) in the Sveta Nedelja administrative territory of Zagreb County, Croatia. As of 2011 it had a population of 486 people.
