= Novaki, Sveta Nedelja =

Novaki
- Settlement
- Location within Croatia
- Country: Croatia
- County: Zagreb
- City: Sveta Nedelja

Area
  - Total: 2.7 km^{2} (1.0 sq mi)

Population (2021)
  - Total: 2,001
  - Density: 740/km^{2} (1,900/sq mi)
- Time zone: UTC+1 (CET)
  - Summer (DST): UTC+2 (CEST)

Novaki is a settlement (naselje) in the Sveta Nedelja administrative territory of Zagreb County, Croatia. As of 2011 it had a population of 2,091 people.
