= Hromec =

Coordinates: 46°13′01″N 15°48′00″E

- Village
- Interactive map of Hromec
- Country: Croatia

Area
  - Total: 9.3 km^{2} (3.6 sq mi)

Population (2021)
  - Total: 375
  - Density: 40/km^{2} (100/sq mi)
- Time zone: UTC+1 (CET)
  - Summer (DST): UTC+2 (CEST)

Hromec is a village in Croatia. It is connected by the D207 highway.
