= Svetonedeljski Breg =

- Settlement
- Location within Croatia
- Coordinates: 45°47′22″N 15°45′44″E
- Country: Croatia
- County: Zagreb
- Town: Sveta Nedelja

Area
  - Total: 0.8 km^{2} (0.31 sq mi)

Population (2021)
  - Total: 179
  - Density: 220/km^{2} (580/sq mi)
- Time zone: UTC+1 (CET)
  - Summer (DST): UTC+2 (CEST)
- Vehicle registration: Vehicle registration plates of Croatia

Svetonedeljski Breg is a settlement in the Town of Sveta Nedelja in Zagreb County, Croatia. According to the 2011 census, it had a population of 177 people.
