= Milica Jurić =

Serbian politician (born 1986)

Milica Jurić (née Mihić; Serbian Cyrillic: Милица Јурић, née Михић; born 1986) is a Serbian politician. She has served in the Assembly of Vojvodina since 2020 as a member of the Serbian Progressive Party.

== Early life and private career ==
Jurić spent her earliest years in the village of Donji Vaganac, in the Lika region of what was then SR Croatia in SFR Yugoslavia. At the outbreak of the Croatian War of Independence in 1991, she was sent to live in Serbia with other members of her family. Her mother and father were expelled from their village as a result of Operation Storm in 1995 and arrived to Serbia as refugees. Jurić discussed her family's experiences in the war at the 2019 commemoration of the Serb victims of Operation Storm.

Jurić is a lawyer and lives in Inđija.

== Politician ==
=== Municipal politics ===
Jurić was given the eighteenth position on the Progressive Party's electoral list for the Inđija municipal assembly in the 2016 Serbian local elections and was elected when the list won a majority victory with twenty-one out of thirty-seven mandates. She served in the assembly for the next four years and did not seek re-election at the local level in 2020.

=== Assembly of Vojvodina ===
Jurić received the fifty-second position on the Progressive Party's Aleksandar Vučić — For Our Children list in the 2020 provincial election and was elected when the list won a majority victory with seventy-six out of 120 mandates. She is now a member of the committee on education and science and the committee on issues of the constitutional and legal status of the province.
