= Brezova Glava =

Coordinates: 45°23′N 15°37′E

- Village
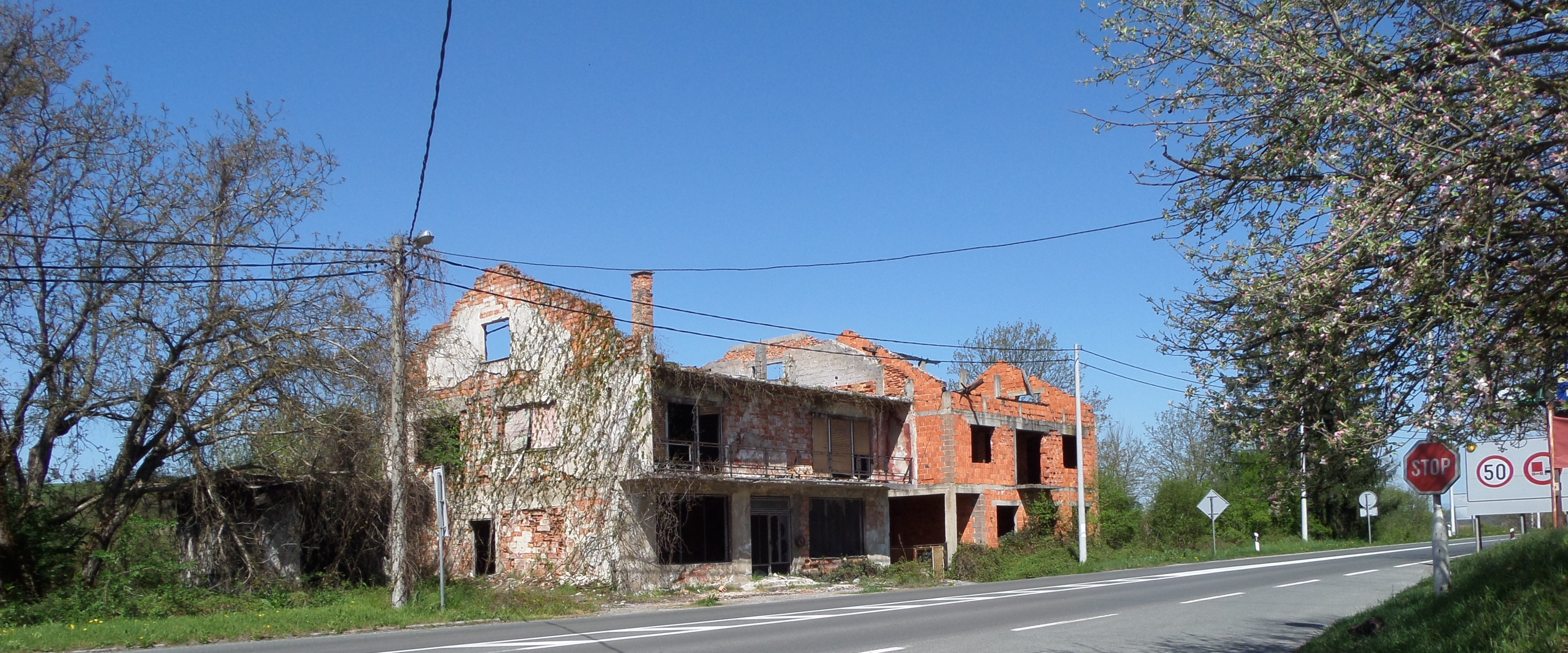
- Interactive map of Brezova Glava
- Country: Croatia
- County: Karlovac County
- City: Karlovac

Area
  - Total: 4.0 km^{2} (1.5 sq mi)

Population (2021)
  - Total: 142
  - Density: 35/km^{2} (92/sq mi)
- Time zone: UTC+1 (CET)
  - Summer (DST): UTC+2 (CEST)

Brezova Glava is a village in Croatia. It is connected by the D1 highway.
