= Kozjan =

- Village
- Interactive map of Kozjan
- Location within Croatia
- Coordinates: 44.70710°N 15.54307°E
- Country: Croatia
- County: Lika-Senj
- Municipality: Plitvička Jezera

Area
  - Total: 9.02 sq mi (23.35 km^{2})

Population (2021)
  - Total: 0
  - Density: 0.0/sq mi (0.0/km^{2})
- Time zone: UTC+1 (CET)
  - Summer (DST): UTC+2 (CEST)

Kozjan is an unpopulated village in Plitvička Jezera, Croatia. It is connected by the A1 motorway.

== History ==
Kozjan contains several archaeological heritage sites, including Tursko groblje (English: Turkish Cemetery) which is described as a medieval necropolis with stecci, and Kozjan Castle, a medieval fortification.

== Demographics ==
Population of Kozjan 1991-2021
Year	1991	2001	2011	2021
Population	50	3	0	0

== See also ==
- List of archaeological heritage sites in Plitvička Jezera
