= Čanak, Croatia =

Čanak
- Village
- Interactive map of Čanak
- Location within Croatia
- Coordinates: 44.73539°N 15.48988°E
- Country: Croatia
- County: Lika-Senj
- Municipality: Plitvička Jezera

Area
  - Total: 15.21 sq mi (39.39 km^{2})

Population (2021)
  - Total: 30
  - Density: 2.0/sq mi (0.76/km^{2})
- Time zone: UTC+1 (CET)
  - Summer (DST): UTC+2 (CEST)

Čanak is a village in Plitvička Jezera, Croatia. It is connected by the A1 motorway.

== History ==
Čanak contains multiple archaeological heritage sites such as Crikvica (also known as Grapčeve kuće) the site of a medieval church with a cemetery, and Gradina, which is a Japodian fortified settlement.

== See also ==
- List of archaeological heritage sites in Plitvička Jezera
