= Smoljanac =

- Village
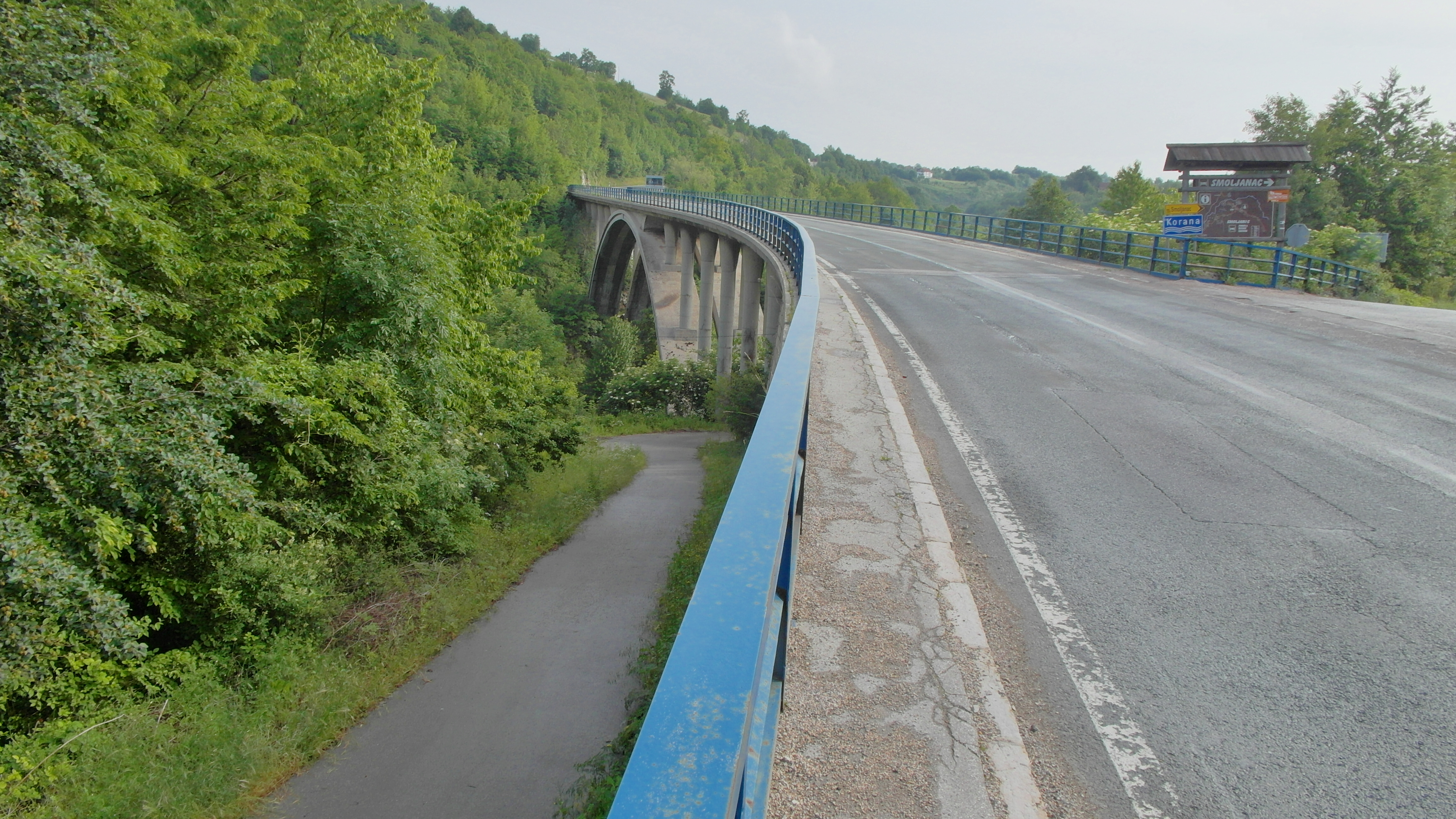
- Bridge over the Korana at Smoljanac
- Interactive map of Smoljanac
- Coordinates: 44.9386°N 15.6597°E
- Country: Croatia
- County: Lika-Senj
- Municipality: Plitvička Jezera

Area
  - Total: 5.0 sq mi (13 km^{2})
- Elevation: 1,204 ft (367 m)

Population (2021)
  - Total: 229
  - Density: 46/sq mi (18/km^{2})
- Time zone: UTC+1 (CET)
  - Summer (DST): UTC+2 (CEST)

Smoljanac is a village in Plitvička Jezera, Croatia. It is connected by the D425 road.

== History ==
In 1941, Luka Cindrić was designated as its Ustaša zbirnik.

On 4–5 July 1942, the Domobrani carried out a clearing operation in Arapov Dol, Smoljanac and Ličko Petrovo Selo. About 150 Partisans were killed and 80 wounded according to Domobran sources, which admitted 3 wounded on their own side, but according to the local Partisans of the Second Lika Brigade, there were no losses.

Smoljanac contains multiple archaeological heritage sites such as Crkvina, the site of the remains of the medieval Church of St. John.

== Demographics ==
Village of Smoljanac: Population trends 1857–2021
v

population	696	775	746	750	850	791	842	810	513	436	379	349	275	256	238	245	229
	1857	1869	1880	1890	1900	1910	1921	1931	1948	1953	1961	1971	1981	1991	2001	2011	2021

Note:Includes data for Rastovača from 1857 to 1880. Sources: Croatian Bureau of Statistics publications

== Gallery ==
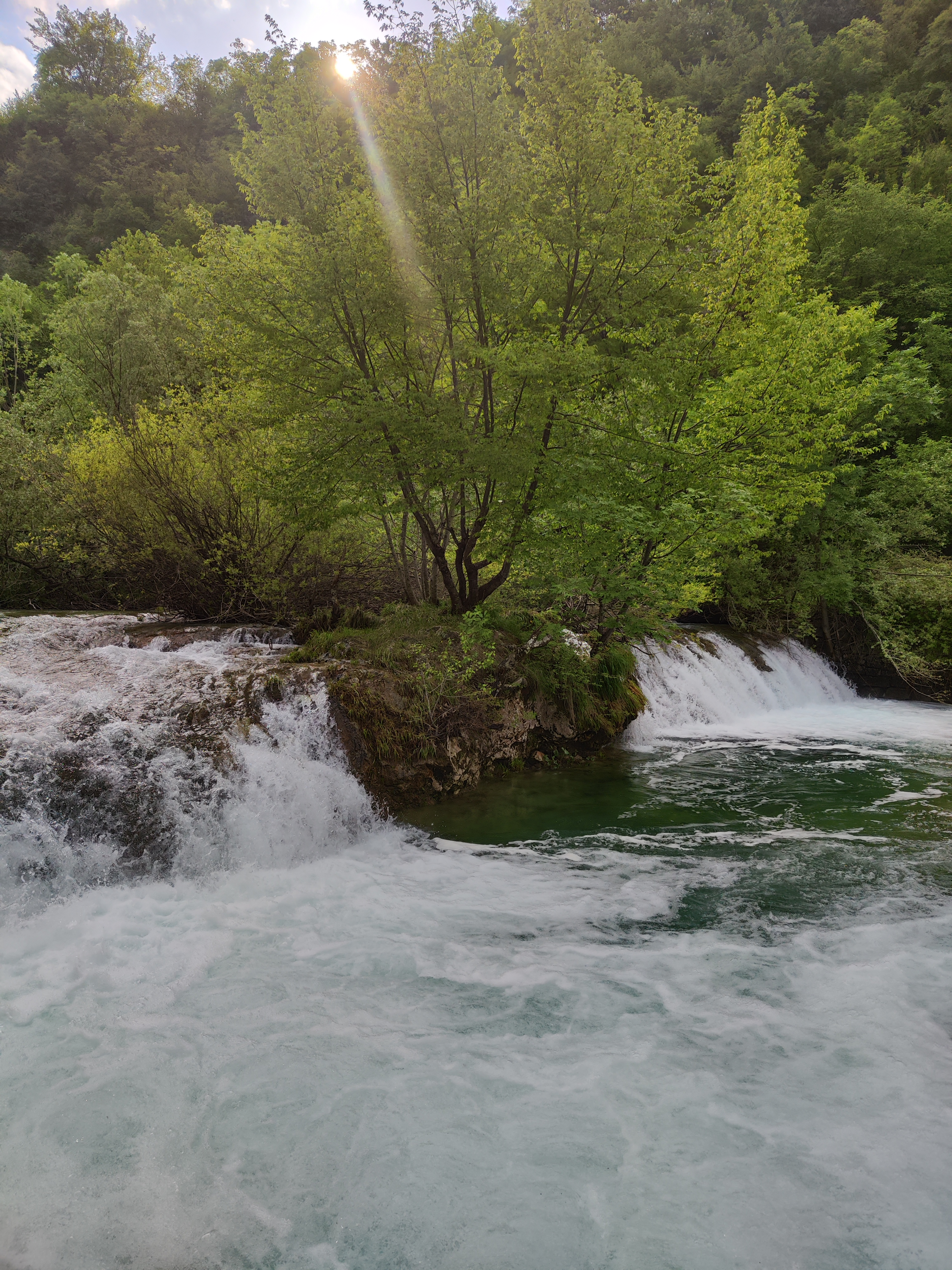
Cascade on the Korana at Smoljanac

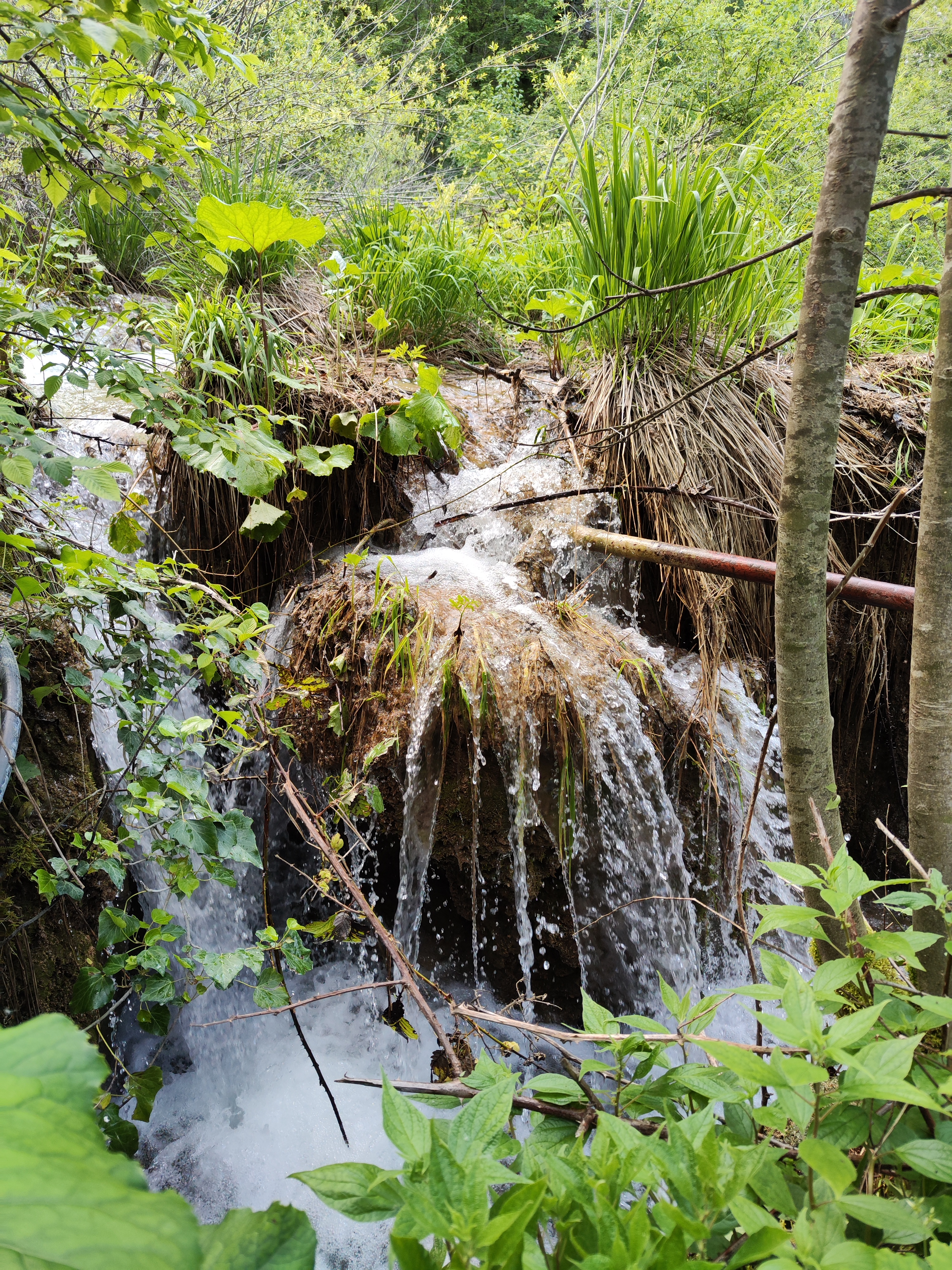
Cascade close-up

== See also ==
- List of archaeological heritage sites in Plitvička Jezera

== Bibliography ==
- Trgo, Fabijan, ed. (1964). Zbornik dokumenata i podataka o Narodno-oslobodilačkom ratu Jugoslovenskih naroda. Vol. V, 32.
