= Lug, Karlovac County =

Coordinates: 45°12′52″N 15°18′29″E

Lug
- Village
- Interactive map of Lug
- Country: Croatia
- County: Karlovac County
- Municipality: Josipdol
- Time zone: UTC+1 (CET)
  - Summer (DST): UTC+2 (CEST)

Lug is a village in Croatia. It is connected by the D1 highway.
