= Krbavica =

- Location within Croatia
- Coordinates: 44°42′20″N 15°36′59″E
- Country: Croatia
- County: Lika-Senj
- Municipality: Plitvička Jezera

Area
  - Total: 23.2 km^{2} (9.0 sq mi)

Population (2021)
  - Total: 29
  - Density: 1.3/km^{2} (3.2/sq mi)
- Time zone: UTC+1 (CET)
  - Summer (DST): UTC+2 (CEST)

Krbavica (Serbian Cyrillic: Крбавица) is a village in Plitvička Jezera, Croatia, near Korenica. Pribići is a section of Krbavica (). The village is eponymous to the nearby Krbavsko Polje.

== History ==
Krbavica contains multiple archaeological heritage sites such as Gradina, the site of an iron age settlement.

== See also ==
- List of archaeological heritage sites in Plitvička Jezera
