= Strmec, Sveta Nedelja =

Strmec
- Coordinates: 45.810802°N 15.789562°E

Area
  - Total: 7.6 km^{2} (2.9 sq mi)

Population (2021)
  - Total: 4,250
  - Density: 560/km^{2} (1,400/sq mi)

Strmec is a village located west of Zagreb, Croatia, near Sveta Nedelja, Zagreb County. The population is 3,907 (census 2011). Between 1910 and 1991, it was known as Strmec Samoborski.
