= Gradina Korenička =

Coordinates: 44°44′03″N 15°43′34″E

- Village
- Interactive map of Gradina Korenička
- Country: Croatia
- County: Lika-Senj
- Municipality: Plitvička Jezera

Area
  - Total: 3.5 km^{2} (1.4 sq mi)

Population (2021)
  - Total: 67
  - Density: 19/km^{2} (50/sq mi)
- Time zone: UTC+1 (CET)
  - Summer (DST): UTC+2 (CEST)

Gradina Korenička (Serbian Cyrillic: Градина Кореничка) is a village in Croatia. It is connected by the D1 highway.

== History ==
Gradina Korenička contains multiple archaeological heritage sites, such as Gradina, the site of a hillfort settlement, and Krst, the site of a settlement with a necropolis.

== See also ==
- List of archaeological heritage sites in Plitvička Jezera
