= Galovec Začretski =

Coordinates: 46°06′18″N 15°53′46″E

- Village
- Interactive map of Galovec Začretski
- Country: Croatia
- County: Krapina-Zagorje County
- Municipality: Sveti Križ Začretje

Area
  - Total: 1.5 km^{2} (0.58 sq mi)

Population (2021)
  - Total: 260
  - Density: 170/km^{2} (450/sq mi)
- Time zone: UTC+1 (CET)
  - Summer (DST): UTC+2 (CEST)

Galovec Začretski is a village in Croatia. It is connected by the D1 highway.
