= Katarina Patačić =

Katarina Patačić (1745 – 1811) was a Croatian countess from the Keglević noble family, married to Franjo Patačić. She is notable for her richly decorated book of collected poems, which she either wrote or compiled.

== Biography ==
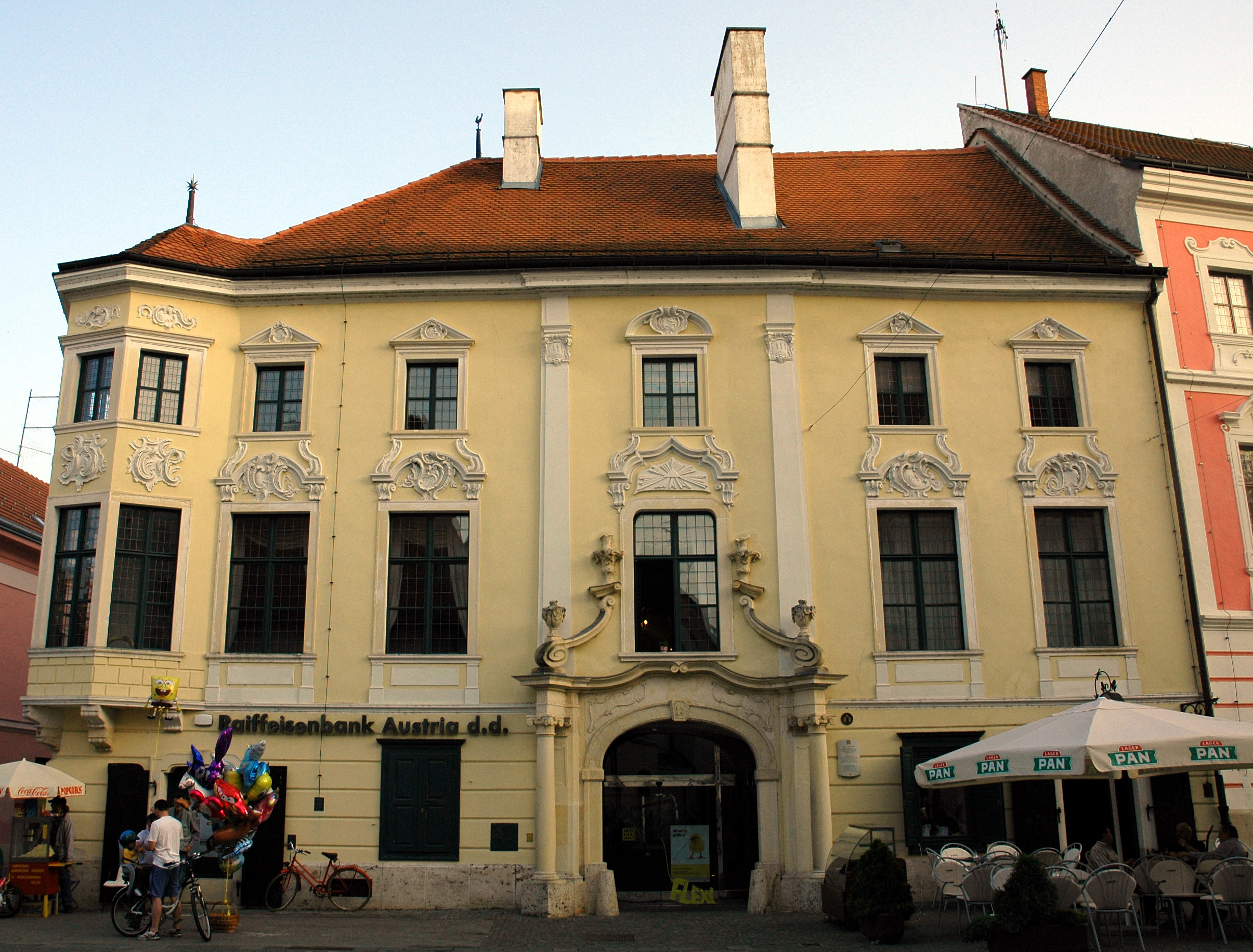
Patačić palace in Varaždin

She was born on August 29, 1745 in Sveti Križ Začretje, as the daughter of Peter VIII Keglević. She was the granddaughter of Ban of Croatia Ivan V Drašković. Following her marriage to Franjo Patačić, she resided in her palace in Varaždin, where she lived until the end of her life in November of 1811. Her husband was one of the chairmen of the Ban council, which governed Croatia, Slavonia and Dalmatia in the latter half of the 18th century. Their Patačić palace became one of the centers of luxurious urban life in Varaždin, various events were organized by the aristocratic couple, including dances, theatre shows and literary salons.

== Peszme Horvatzke ==
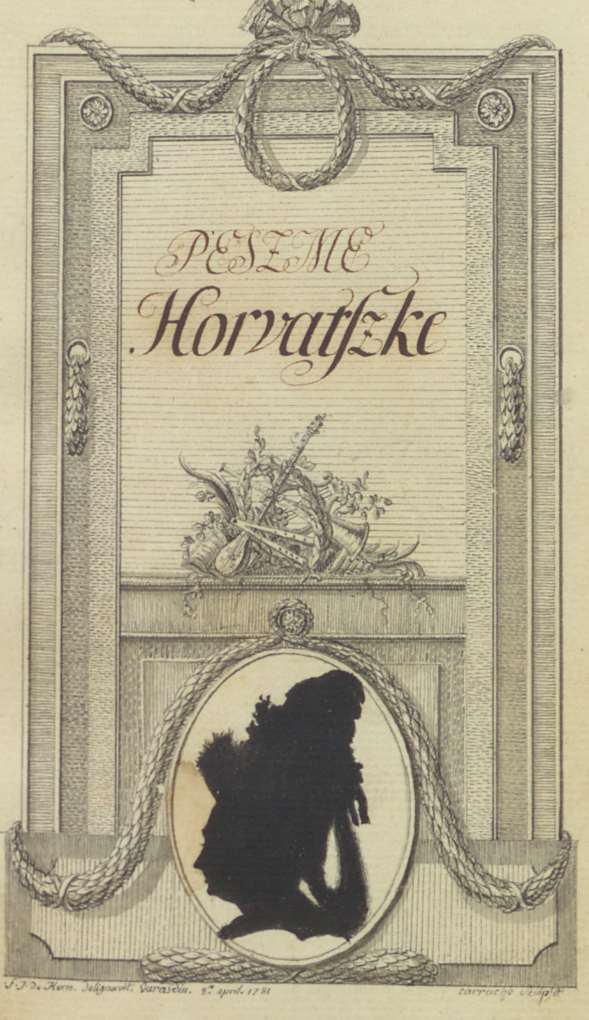
Title page of Peszme Horvatszke, 1781

More than 30 poems were compiled in a handwritten and richly decorated book bearing Katarina's signature, under the title Peszme Horvatszke in 1781. The songbook is the first secular one in Kajkavian and northern Croatian literature. All of the poems are love poems, of rococo and aristocratic influences, half of which are translations of poems in the Italian language. The authorship of the rest of the poems is uncertain, but is assumed to be either Katarina herself, or someone from her circle. The poems combine influences from both the local oral tradition, but also from contemporary European trends at the time. She herself is referenced in these poems as 'Kate' of 'Katice'.

The book was dedicated to the cousin of her husband and a noted lexicographer, Adam Patačić. On the title page a stylized image of various instruments is shown, namely the folk tamburica, trumpet and lyre instrument above the silhouette depiction of Katarina Patačić.
