= Bjelopolje =

- Village
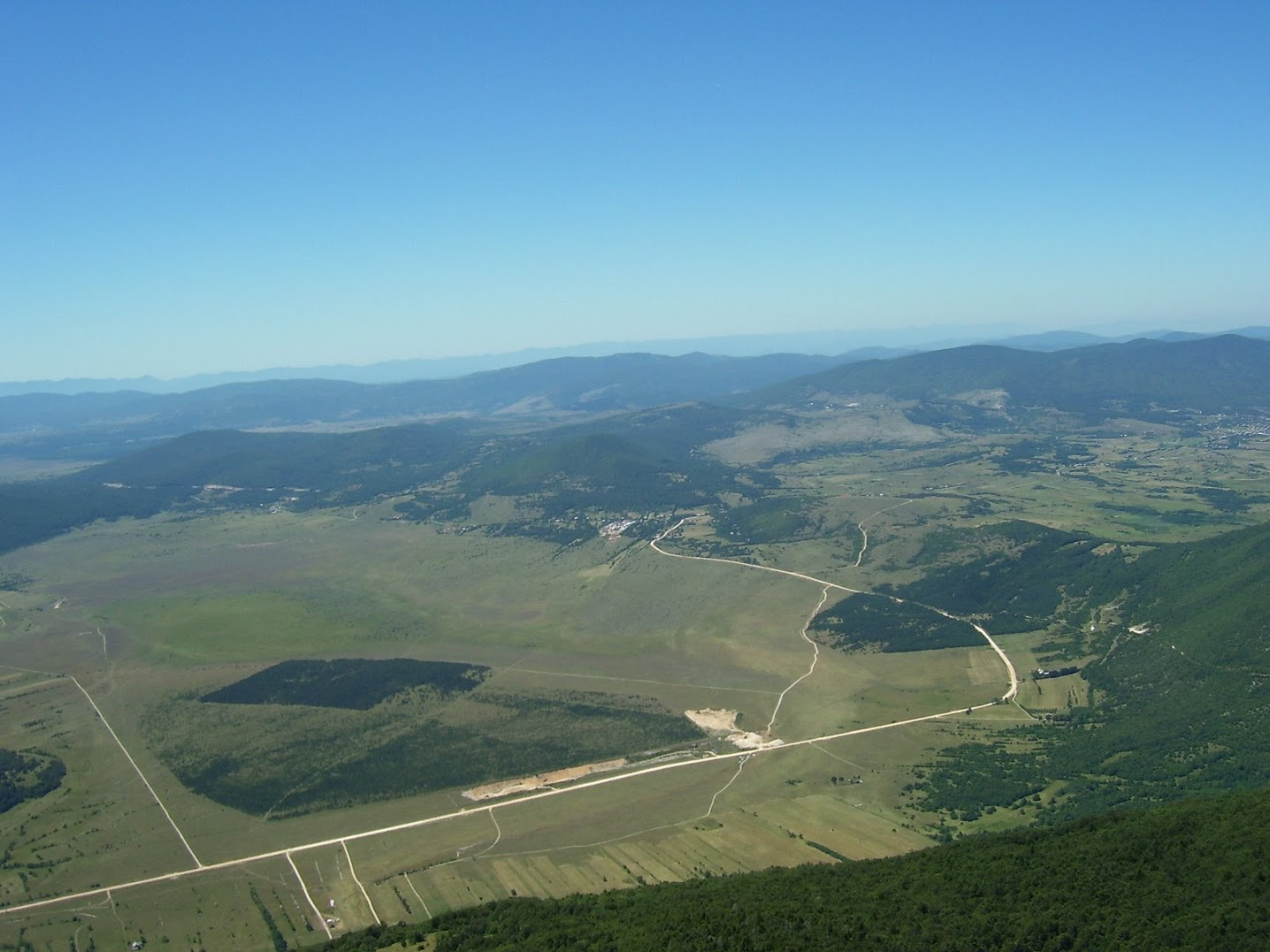
- Interactive map of Bjelopolje
- Location within Croatia
- Country: Croatia
- County: Lika-Senj
- Municipality: Plitvička Jezera

Area
  - Total: 4.7 sq mi (12.1 km^{2})

Population (2021)
  - Total: 71
  - Density: 15/sq mi (5.9/km^{2})
- Time zone: UTC+1 (CET)
  - Summer (DST): UTC+2 (CEST)

Bjelopolje (Serbian Cyrillic: Бјелопоље) is a village in Plitvička Jezera, Croatia. It is connected by the D1 highway.

== History ==
Bjelopolje contains multiple archaeological heritage sites such as Prijespa, which is a site of a Japodian hillfort settlement.

== See also ==
- List of archaeological heritage sites in Plitvička Jezera
