= Bestovje =

Village in Zagreb County, Croatia

- Village
- Location within Croatia
- Coordinates: 45.806704°N 15.808756°E
- Country: Croatia
- County: Zagreb County

Area
  - Total: 1.6 km^{2} (0.62 sq mi)

Population (2021)
  - Total: 2,236
  - Density: 1,400/km^{2} (3,600/sq mi)

Bestovje is a village located west of Zagreb, Croatia, near Sveta Nedelja, Zagreb County. The population is 2,402 (census 2011). It has existed as a standalone settlement since 1910.
