= Srebrnjak, Sveta Nedelja =

Srebrnjak
- Settlement
- Location within Croatia
- Country: Croatia
- County: Zagreb
- City: Sveta Nedelja

Area
  - Total: 0.9 km^{2} (0.35 sq mi)

Population (2021)
  - Total: 148
  - Density: 160/km^{2} (430/sq mi)
- Time zone: UTC+1 (CET)
  - Summer (DST): UTC+2 (CEST)

Srebrnjak is a settlement (naselje) in the Sveta Nedelja administrative territory of Zagreb County, Croatia. As of 2011 it had a population of 128 people.
