= List of archaeological heritage sites in Plitvička Jezera =

Archaeological sites in Croatia

Plitvička Jezera is a municipality in Croatia. It contains 33 archaeological heritage sites listed in the Lika-Senj County gazette.

== Key ==
Ref.	Definition
AL	Archaeological site
AF	Archaeological heritage - fortification architecture

== Archaeological heritage sites ==
Ref.	Location	Site name	Site description
AL1	Bjelopolje	Prijespa	Japodian hillfort settlement
AL2	Bjelopolje	Crikvina	Slopes of the Šanac hill
AL3	Čanak	Crikvica, Grapčeve kuće	Site of an older church with a cemetery, near caves
AL4	Čanak	Gradina	Japodian hillfort settlement
AL5	Čanak	Samogradica	Garden settlement
AL6	Čanak	Srdelj, Serdelj	Medieval fortification
AL7	Čanak	Serdel	Medieval fortification
AL8	Kozjan	Tursko groblje (Note: Translates to "Turkish Cemetery")	Medieval necropolis with stecci
AL9	Čanak	-	Remains of the chapel of St. Mark
AL10	Donji Vaganac	Crkvina	Remains of a medieval church
AL11	Gornji Vaganac	Kukuruzovićeva gradina i pećina (Note: Translates to "Kukuruzović's Fortification and Cave")	Settlement, 1st-2nd century
AL12	Gradina Korenička	Gradina	Hillfort settlement; site of the medieval Korenica castle
AL13	Gradina Korenička	Krst	Settlement; necropolis
AL14	Kompolje Koreničko	Crkvina	15th century medieval sacred building
AL15	Krbavica	Gradina	Iron age settlement
AL16	Krbavica	Southern slopes of Gradina	Early iron age necropolis
AL17	Krbavica	Gradina	Hillfort settlement
AL18	Ličko Petrovo Selo	Čalopek	Hillfort settlement
AL19	Ličko Petrovo Selo	Barića pećina (Note: Translates to "Barića Cave")	Refuge; shelter
AL20	Smoljanac	Crkvina	Remains of the medieval Church of St. John
AL21	Smoljanac	Pasja Gomila	Burial mounds?
AL22	Trnavac	Crkvina	Site of a medieval church
AL23	Trnavac	Gradina	Hillfort settlement
AL24	Tuk Bjelopoljski	Galovac	Medieval Hillfort settlement
AL25	Tuk Bjelopoljski	Svinjar	Japodian hillfort
AL26	Gradina Korenička	Crkvina	-
AL27	Šeganovac	Kovrčni brdeljak	-
AF1	Bjelopolje	Šanac	Anti-Ottoman fortification
AF2	Kompolje Koreničko	Kulina	15th-18th century fortified castle
AF3	Kozjan	Burg "Kozjan"	Fortification
AF4	Novo Selo Koreničko	Abdić brdo	17th century Ottoman house
AF5	Trnavac	Kulina	17th century Turkish tower
AF6	Vranovača	Mrsinjgrad	Medieval fortress

== See also ==
- Japodes
