= Orešje, Sveta Nedelja =

Coordinates: 45°49′N 15°48′E

Orešje
- Settlement
- Location within Croatia
- Country: Croatia
- County: Zagreb
- City: Sveta Nedelja

Area
  - Total: 3.3 km^{2} (1.3 sq mi)

Population (2021)
  - Total: 1,097
  - Density: 330/km^{2} (860/sq mi)
- Time zone: UTC+1 (CET)
  - Summer (DST): UTC+2 (CEST)

Orešje is a settlement (naselje) in the Sveta Nedelja administrative territory of Zagreb County, Croatia. As of 2011, it had a population of 1,043 persons.
