= Igrišće =

Coordinates: 45°57′46″N 15°52′50″E

- Interactive map of Igrišće

Igrišće is a village in the municipality of Jakovlje, Croatia. In the 2011 census, it had 731 inhabitants.
