= Švaljkovec =

Coordinates: 46°05′49″N 15°54′14″E

- Village
- Interactive map of Švaljkovec
- Country: Croatia
- County: Krapina-Zagorje County

Area
  - Total: 1.0 km^{2} (0.39 sq mi)

Population (2021)
  - Total: 313
  - Density: 310/km^{2} (810/sq mi)
- Time zone: UTC+1 (CET)
  - Summer (DST): UTC+2 (CEST)

Švaljkovec is a village in Croatia. It is connected by the D1 highway.
