= Veliká Ves (Prague-East District) =

- Municipality
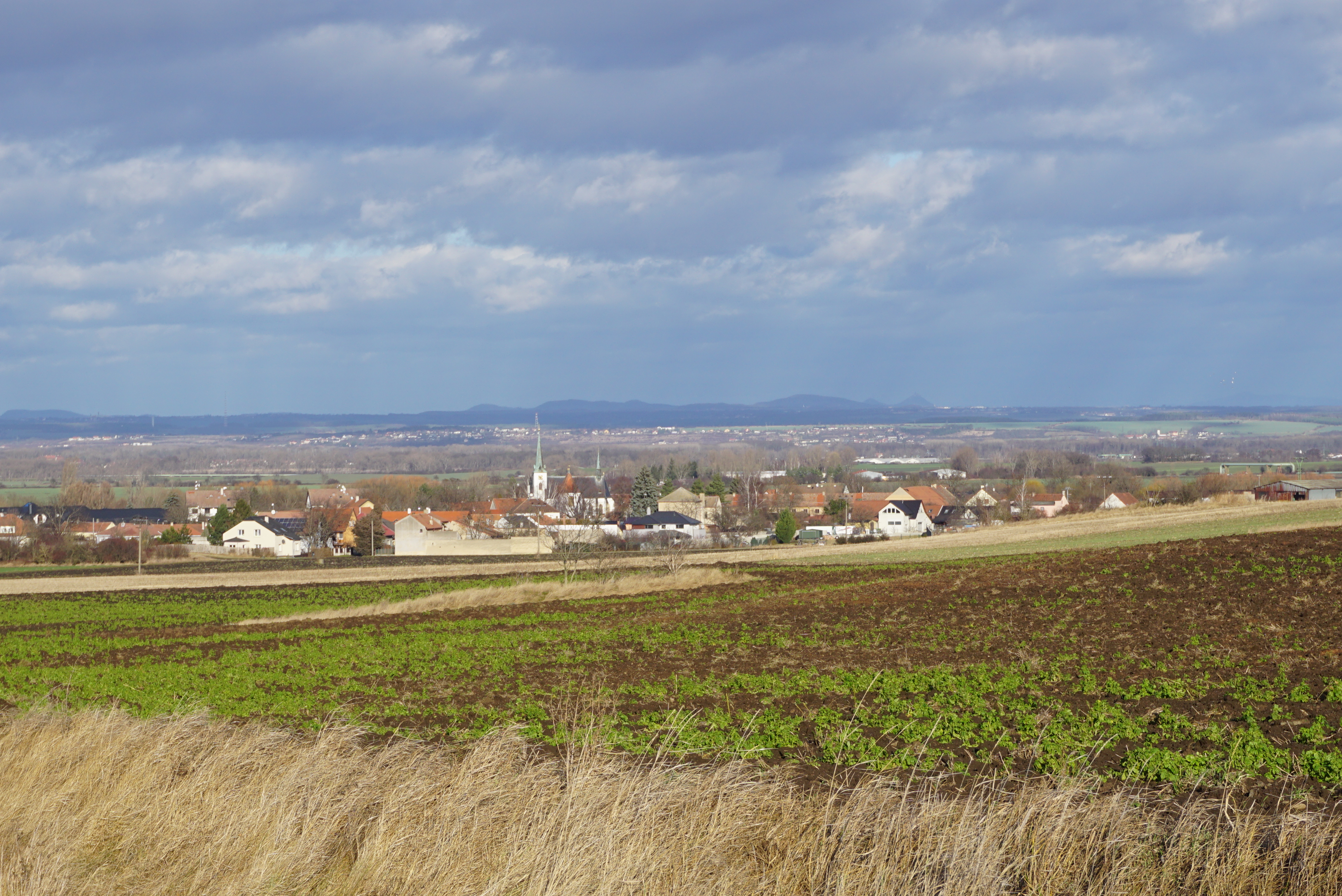
- View from the southwest

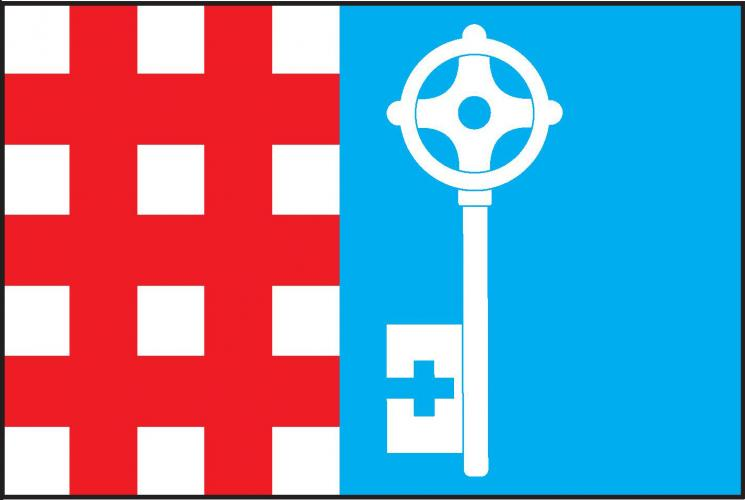
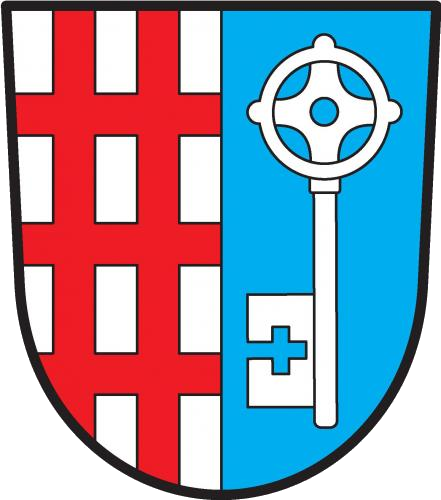
- Flag Coat of arms

- Location in the Czech Republic
- Coordinates: 50°14′37″N 14°27′19″E
- Country: Czech Republic
- Region: Central Bohemian
- District: Prague-East
- First mentioned: 1271

Area
  - Total: 5.70 km^{2} (2.20 sq mi)
- Elevation: 194 m (636 ft)

Population (2026-01-01)
  - Total: 402
  - Density: 70.5/km^{2} (183/sq mi)
- Time zone: UTC+1 (CET)
  - Summer (DST): UTC+2 (CEST)
- Postal code: 250 70
- Website: www.velikaves.eu

Veliká Ves is a municipality and village in Prague-East District in the Central Bohemian Region of the Czech Republic. It has about 400 inhabitants.

== Demographics ==
Historical population
Year	Pop.	±%
1869	308	—
1880	339	+10.1%
1890	355	+4.7%
1900	363	+2.3%
1910	341	−6.1%
1921	297	−12.9%
1930	365	+22.9%
1950	285	−21.9%
1961	292	+2.5%
1970	311	+6.5%
1980	255	−18.0%
1991	221	−13.3%
2001	247	+11.8%
2011	283	+14.6%
2021	390	+37.8%
Source: Censuses
