= Lupinjak =

Coordinates: 46°12′N 15°44′E

- Village
- Interactive map of Lupinjak
- Country: Croatia
- County: Krapina-Zagorje County

Area
  - Total: 2.9 km^{2} (1.1 sq mi)

Population (2021)
  - Total: 343
  - Density: 120/km^{2} (310/sq mi)
- Time zone: UTC+1 (CET)
  - Summer (DST): UTC+2 (CEST)

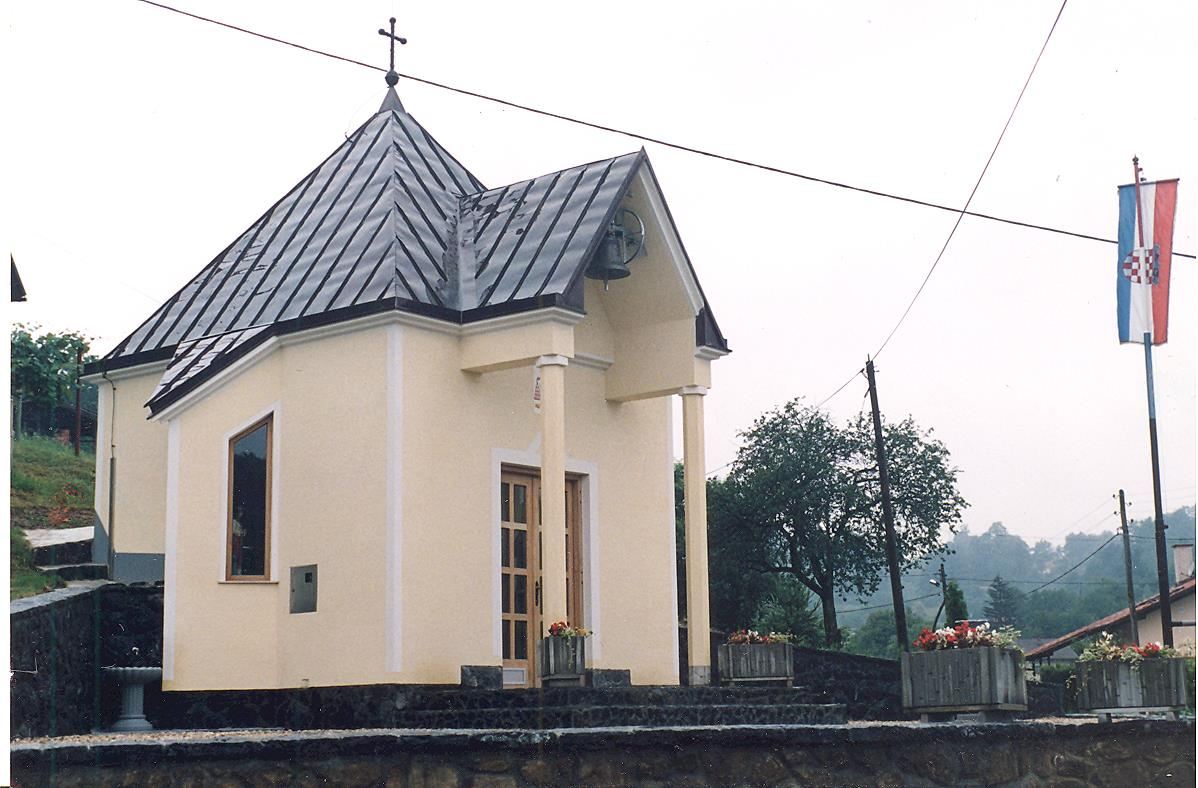
Chapel in Lupinjak

Lupinjak is a village in Croatia. It is connected by the D1 highway.
