= Zaklopača, Croatia =

Coordinates: 44°53′04″N 15°41′48″E

- Village
- Interactive map of Zaklopača, Croatia
- Country: Croatia
- County: Lika-Senj
- Municipality: Plitvička Jezera

Area
  - Total: 2.5 sq mi (6.6 km^{2})

Population (2021)
  - Total: 2
  - Density: 0.78/sq mi (0.30/km^{2})
- Time zone: UTC+1 (CET)
  - Summer (DST): UTC+2 (CEST)

Zaklopača (Serbian Cyrillic: Заклопача) is a village in Plitvička Jezera, Croatia. It is connected by the D504 highway.
