= Ciglenica Zagorska =

Coordinates: 46°04′19″N 15°55′23″E

- Village
- Interactive map of Ciglenica Zagorska
- Country: Croatia
- County: Krapina-Zagorje County

Area
  - Total: 3.7 km^{2} (1.4 sq mi)

Population (2021)
  - Total: 551
  - Density: 150/km^{2} (390/sq mi)
- Time zone: UTC+1 (CET)
  - Summer (DST): UTC+2 (CEST)

Ciglenica Zagorska is a village in Croatia. It is connected by the D1 highway.
