= Mala Gorica, Zagreb County =

Mala Gorica
- Settlement
- Location within Croatia
- Country: Croatia
- County: Zagreb
- City: Sveta Nedelja

Area
  - Total: 2.7 km^{2} (1.0 sq mi)

Population (2021)
  - Total: 612
  - Density: 230/km^{2} (590/sq mi)
- Time zone: UTC+1 (CET)
  - Summer (DST): UTC+2 (CEST)

Mala Gorica is a settlement (naselje) in the Sveta Nedelja administrative territory of Zagreb County, Croatia. As of 2011 it had a population of 623 people.
