= Štrucljevo =

Coordinates: 46°03′N 15°55′E

- Village
- Interactive map of Štrucljevo
- Country: Croatia
- County: Krapina-Zagorje County

Area
  - Total: 1.9 km^{2} (0.73 sq mi)

Population (2021)
  - Total: 321
  - Density: 170/km^{2} (440/sq mi)
- Time zone: UTC+1 (CET)
  - Summer (DST): UTC+2 (CEST)

Štrucljevo is a village in Croatia. It is connected by the D1 highway.
