= Pavlovec Zabočki =

Coordinates: 46°01′08″N 15°52′59″E

- Village
- Interactive map of Pavlovec Zabočki
- Country: Croatia

Area
  - Total: 0.66 sq mi (1.7 km^{2})

Population (2021)
  - Total: 576
  - Density: 880/sq mi (340/km^{2})
- Time zone: UTC+1 (CET)
  - Summer (DST): UTC+2 (CEST)

Pavlovec Zabočki is a village in Croatia.
