= Sveta Nedelja, Zagreb County =

Sveta Nedelja
- Town
- Grad Sveta Nedelja; Town of Sveta Nedelja
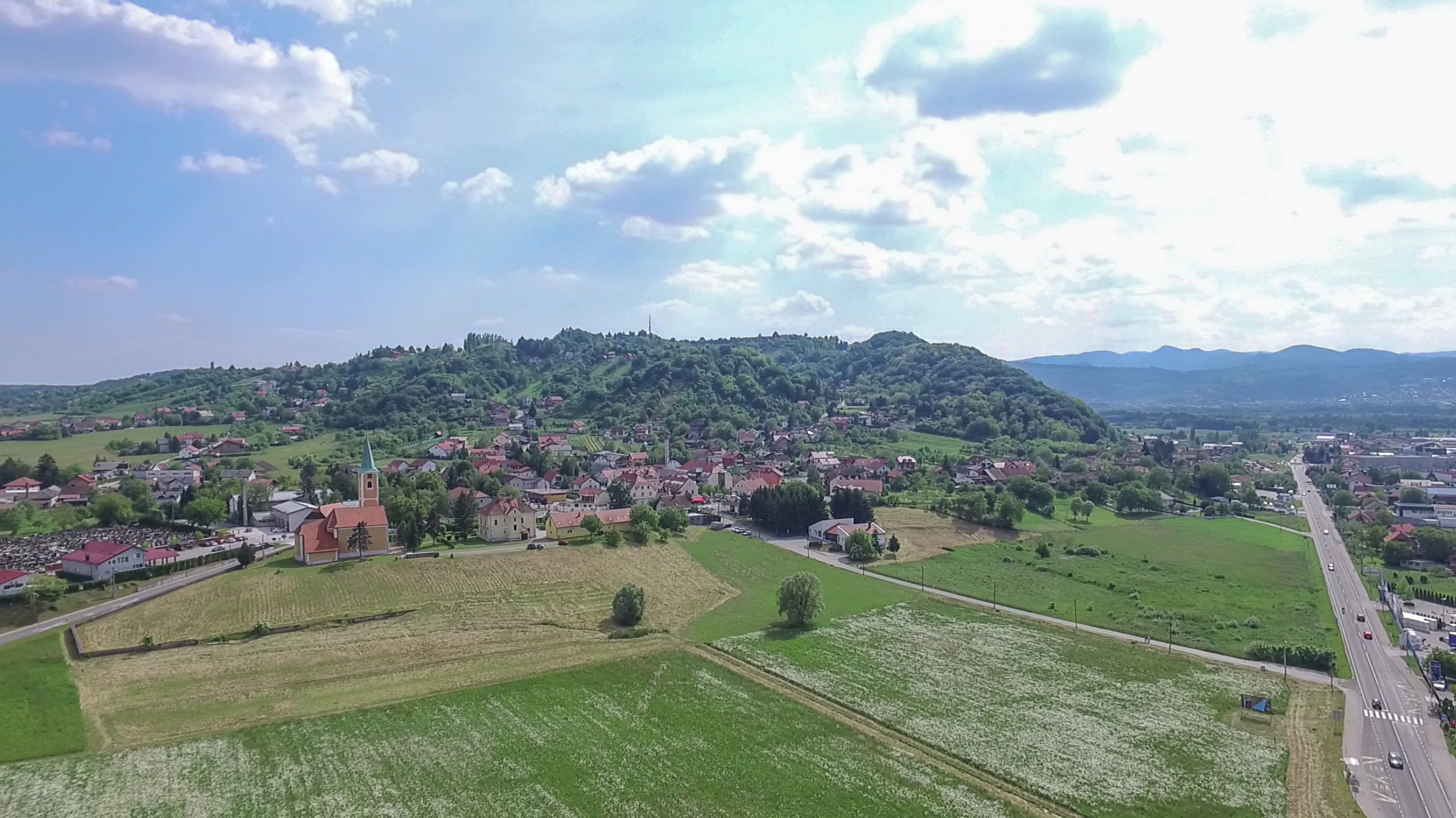
- View of Sveta Nedelja

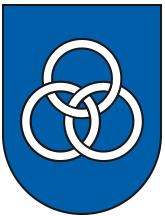
- Coat of arms

- Location of Sveta Nedelja in Croatia
- Coordinates: 45.79°N 15.78°E
- Country: Croatia
- Region: Central Croatia (Prigorje)
- County: Zagreb County

Government
  - Mayor: Dario Zurovec (Fokus)
  - City Council: 15 members: Fokus (10); HDZ (1); SDP (1); Independents (3)

Area
  - Town: 39.8 km^{2} (15.4 sq mi)
  - Urban: 2.9 km^{2} (1.1 sq mi)

Population (2021)
  - Town: 18,221
  - Density: 458/km^{2} (1,190/sq mi)
  - Urban: 1,363
  - Urban density: 470/km^{2} (1,200/sq mi)
- Time zone: UTC+1 (CET)
  - Summer (DST): UTC+2 (CEST)
- Postal code: 10431
- Area code: 01
- Vehicle registration: ZG
- Website: grad-svetanedelja.hr

Sveta Nedelja or, until 1991, Sveta Nedjelja (lit. 'Holy Sunday' or 'Saint Kyriaki') is a town in Zagreb County, Croatia. It is one of the provincial satellite towns in Zagreb's metropolitan region.

== Geography ==
Sveta Nedelja is situated west of Zagreb, between Zagreb and Samobor. It has an exit on the A3 motorway, which passes northwest-southeast through the town, and Franjo Tuđman Street runs east-west toward the Podsused Bridge.

== Population ==
In the Croatian census of 2011, the total population of the Town of Sveta Nedelja was 18,059, divided into 14 settlements:

- Bestovje, population 2,402
- Brezje, population 1,506
- Jagnjić Dol, population 486
- Kalinovica, population 385
- Kerestinec, population 1,433
- Mala Gorica, population 623
- Novaki, population 2,091
- Orešje, population 1,043
- Rakitje, population 2,301
- Srebrnjak, population 128
- Strmec, population 3,907
- Sveta Nedelja, population 1,338
- Svetonedeljski Breg, population 177
- Žitarka, population 239

== Administration ==
Rimac Concept One

Town government, health-service, post office are the part of infrastructure of Sveta Nedelja. Head of the Town government is a Mayor (current mayor is Dario Zurovec) with head town administration.

== Economy ==
Rimac Automobili has its headquarters in the town. It is also the wealthiest municipality in Zagreb County and one of the wealthiest municipalities in the country and with most registered small enterprises in the country.

In May 2020, the city of Sveta Nedelja, in cooperation with the Croatian cryptocurrency company Electrocoin, became one of the first cities in the world to enable cryptocurrency payments for municipal services.

== Monuments and sightseeing ==
There are several monuments and buildings for sightseers in the Town of Sveta Nedelja:

- Baroquesqe Holy Trinity parish church and parish house in Sveta Nedelja
- The old parish house "Crkvenjak" in Sveta Nedelja
- St. Roch Chapel, Sveta Nedelja
- Medieval Erdödy Castle in Kerestinec
- Old mansions in Brezje and Rakitje
- Baroquesqe St. Andrew chapel in Novaki
- St. Mary Magdalena chapel in Mala Gorica
- Monument to the victims of communist crimes

The Ministry of Croatian Veterans discovered and exhumed in June 2025 two mass graves from the period after World War II with the remains of 49 men.

== Education ==
Primary education in Sveta Nedelja is covered by two elementary schools: the Sveta Nedelja Elementary School in Sveta Nedelja and the Vladimir Deščak Elementary School in Novaki. Sveta Nedelja Elementary School also has two branch offices in Kerestinec and Strmec. Another branch office is located in Rakov Potok in the Samobor municipal area. A new elementary school in Strmec is planned in the near future.

== Culture ==
Local Klapa Barun organizes annual Klapa meetings in Sveta Nedelja (Croatian: Klape u Svetoj Nedelji; Susret klapa u Svetoj Nedelji) with different host-locations every year.

== Notable people ==
- Mihalj Šilobod Bolšić (1724–1787) – Catholic priest, mathematician, writer, and musical theorist primarily known for writing the first Croatian arithmetic textbook, Arithmatika Horvatzka (published in Zagreb, 1758)
