= Brezje, Sveta Nedelja =

Brezje
- Location within Croatia
- Coordinates: 45.789134°N 15.7904°E
- Country: Croatia
- County: Zagreb County
- City: Sveta Nedelja

Area
  - Total: 2.5 km^{2} (0.97 sq mi)

Population (2021)
  - Total: 1,468
  - Density: 590/km^{2} (1,500/sq mi)
- Time zone: UTC+1 (CET)
  - Summer (DST): UTC+2 (CEST)

Brezje is a settlement in Sveta Nedelja, Zagreb County, Croatia, population 1,506 (census 2011).

Glück-Hafner Manor, built between 1846 and 1851 in late baroque-historicist style, is located in Brezje.
