= Kalinovica =

Coordinates: 45°46′N 15°47′E

- Settlement
- Location within Croatia
- Country: Croatia
- County: Zagreb
- City: Sveta Nedelja

Area
  - Total: 2.1 km^{2} (0.81 sq mi)

Population (2021)
  - Total: 409
  - Density: 190/km^{2} (500/sq mi)
- Time zone: UTC+1 (CET)
  - Summer (DST): UTC+2 (CEST)

Kalinovica is a settlement (naselje) in the Sveta Nedelja administrative territory of Zagreb County, Croatia. As of 2011 it had a population of 385 people.
