= Ličko Petrovo Selo =

- Village
- Location within Croatia
- Coordinates: 44.880242°N 15.711789°E
- Country: Croatia
- Region: Lika
- County: Lika-Senj
- Municipality: Plitvička Jezera

Area
  - Total: 17.9 km^{2} (6.9 sq mi)

Population (2021)
  - Total: 54
  - Density: 3.0/km^{2} (7.8/sq mi)
- Time zone: UTC+1 (CET)
  - Summer (DST): UTC+2 (CEST)
- Postal code: 53233

Ličko Petrovo Selo is a village in Plitvička Jezera, Croatia. It is located near the Plitvice Lakes. It is connected by the D1 highway. East of the village, the D217 ends at the Ličko Petrovo Selo border crossing with Bosnia and Herzegovina (continuing to Izačić and on to Bihać).

Founded in 1792, Ličko Petrovo Selo was historically a majority Serb community and has an Orthodox church. During World War II, as part of the genocide of ethnic Serbs, in summer 1941 the Croatian Ustaše regime killed about 890 inhabitants of Ličko Petrovo Selo and the nearby village of Melinovac, throwing their bodies into a pit. The village was largely destroyed.

Ličko Petrovo Selo was rebuilt in the 1970s. Factories and Željava Air Base were nearby, as well as the Plitvice Lakes national park, which opened in 1949. During the Yugoslav Wars of the 1990s, it was within the breakaway Republic of Serbian Krajina and again was extensively destroyed. Most residents fled, and in the 2020s the village has a population of a few hundred, mostly elderly, with some houses being second homes and many yet to be repaired. There is a post office and a 58-room hotel, opened in 2019 on the site of the school.

== History ==
On 4–5 July 1942, the Domobrani carried out a clearing operation in Arapov Dol, Smoljanac and Ličko Petrovo Selo. About 150 Partisans were killed and 80 wounded according to Domobran sources, which admitted 3 wounded on their own side, but according to the local Partisans of the Second Lika Brigade, there were no losses.

Ličko Petrovo Selo contains multiple archaeological heritage sites such as Čalopek, the site of a hillfort settlement, and Barića pećina, the site of a refuge/shelter.

== Notable people ==
- Josef Philipp Vukassovich

== See also ==
- List of archaeological heritage sites in Plitvička Jezera

== Bibliography ==
- Trgo, Fabijan, ed. (1964). Zbornik dokumenata i podataka o Narodno-oslobodilačkom ratu Jugoslovenskih naroda. Vol. V, 32.
