= Mirkovec =

Coordinates: 46°03′N 15°56′E

- Village
- Interactive map of Mirkovec
- Country: Croatia
- County: Krapina-Zagorje County

Area
  - Total: 2.0 km^{2} (0.77 sq mi)

Population (2021)
  - Total: 457
  - Density: 230/km^{2} (590/sq mi)
- Time zone: UTC+1 (CET)
  - Summer (DST): UTC+2 (CEST)

Mirkovec is a village in Croatia. It is connected by the D1 highway.
