= Velika Ves, Croatia =

Velika Ves
- Village
- Interactive map of Velika Ves
- Location within Croatia
- Coordinates: 46°07′N 15°53′E
- Country: Croatia
- County: Krapina-Zagorje County

Area
  - Total: 3.2 km^{2} (1.2 sq mi)

Population (2021)
  - Total: 722
  - Density: 230/km^{2} (580/sq mi)
- Time zone: UTC+1 (CET)
  - Summer (DST): UTC+2 (CEST)

Velika Ves is a village in Croatia, population 727 (census 2011). It is connected by the D1 highway.
