= Prijeboj =

Coordinates: 44°50′N 15°41′E

- Village
- Interactive map of Prijeboj
- Location within Croatia
- Country: Croatia
- County: Lika-Senj
- Municipality: Plitvička Jezera

Area
  - Total: 3.4 sq mi (8.9 km^{2})

Population (2021)
  - Total: 5
  - Density: 1.5/sq mi (0.56/km^{2})
- Time zone: UTC+1 (CET)
  - Summer (DST): UTC+2 (CEST)

Prijeboj is a village in Plitvička Jezera, Croatia. It is connected by the D1 highway.
