= Bedekovčina =

Municipality of Croatia

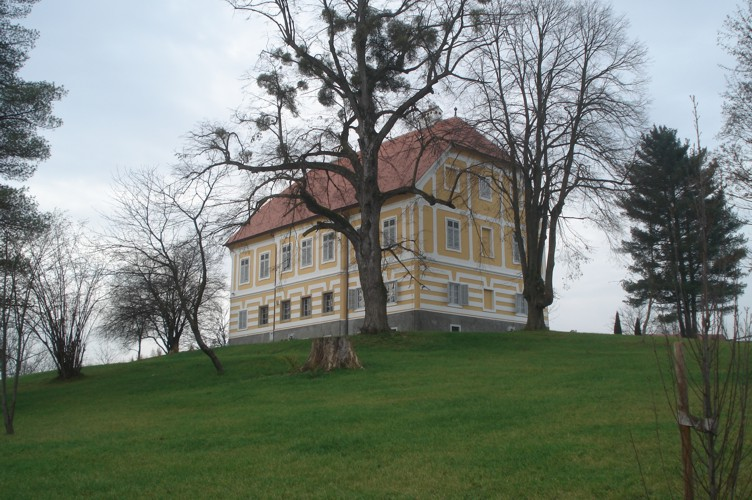

- Location within Croatia
- Coordinates: 46.0333°N 16°E
- Country: Croatia
- County: Krapina-Zagorje County

Government
  - Mayor: Željko Odak (HDZ)

Area
  - Total: 51.4 km^{2} (19.8 sq mi)

Population (2021)
  - Total: 7,340
  - Density: 143/km^{2} (370/sq mi)
- Time zone: UTC+1 (CET)
  - Summer (DST): UTC+2 (CEST)
- Website: bedekovcina.hr

Bedekovčina is a village and municipality in the Krapina-Zagorje County in Croatia. It is connected by the state road D24 and R201 railway. In the 2021 census, the total population of the municipality was 7,340.

== History ==
The archaeological site of the Kiebel fortress is located in the area of the Bedekovčina Municipality. In 1248, the name of the noble town Castrum Cubul, which should be identified with the present-day toponym Kebel, first appears in written records. Almost twenty years later, in 1267, the Croatian-Hungarian King Bela IV granted Kumur, i.e. Komor in the then Varaždin County, to the Bedeković noble family. In 1543, in the War Tax List, we find estates owned by the Bedeković family: Komor, owned by Mihovil Bedeković, and Našenina (Naseyna), owned by Nikola Bedeković. Although the exact location of Našenina has not yet been determined, like Komor, it was located in the area of present-day Bedekovčina, which was named after its lords, the noble Bedeković family.

The Municipality of Bedekovčina was founded in 1940 by order of the Ban of the Banovina of Croatia, Ivan Šubašić. After World War II its development continued, and at the time Mače was also part of the Municipality of Bedekovčina. In 1960, the Municipality of Bedekovčina was abolished and was integrated into the Municipality of Zabok.

The municipality of Bedekovčina was reconstituted as an independent unit of local government in 1993, and its first mayor was Dragutin Burek. The area of today's Bedekovčina Municipality is divided between the parishes of Bedekovčina, Orehovica and Mača which played a major role in the development of settlements in the area of the Bedekovčina Municipality, especially since priests were the bearers and promoters of education.

== Demographics ==
In 2021, the municipality had 7,340 residents in the following 15 settlements:

- Bedekovčina, population 3,119
- Belovar Zlatarski, population 98
- Brestovec Orehovički, population 305
- Grabe, population 391
- Kebel, population 345
- Križanče, population 122
- Lug Orehovički, population 214
- Lug Poznanovečki, population 594
- Martinec Orehovički, population 360
- Orehovica, population 226
- Poznanovec, population 887
- Pustodol Orehovički, population 272
- Vojnić-Breg, population 120
- Zadravec, population 98
- Židovinjak, population 189
Bedekovčina: Population trends 1857–2021
v

population	3982	4549	5222	5677	6575	7690	7366	8169	9196	9043	8932	8742	8574	8773	8482	8041	7340
	1857	1869	1880	1890	1900	1910	1921	1931	1948	1953	1961	1971	1981	1991	2001	2011	2021

Sources: Croatian Bureau of Statistics publications

In the 2021 census, the absolute majority were Croats at 98.68%.

== Administration ==
The current mayor of Bedekovčina is Željko Odak (HDZ) and the Bedekovčina Municipal Council consists of 13 seats.

Groups	Councilors per group
SDP-HSU-Reformists	5 / 13
HDZ	5 / 13
HNS	3 / 13

== Literature ==
- Obad Šćitaroci, Mladen; Bojanić Obad Šćitaroci, Bojana; Dundović, Boris (2013). "Manors and Gardens in Northern Croatia in the Age of Historicism" (PDF). Centropa. pp. 175–186. ISSN 1532-5563. Archived from the original (PDF) on 2025-05-05.
