= D217 road =

Road in Croatia

D217 state road

Route information
- Part of
- Length: 3.0 km (1.9 mi)

Major junctions
- From: D1 in Ličko Petrovo Selo
- To: Ličko Petrovo Selo border crossing to Bosnia and Herzegovina

Location
- Country: Croatia
- Counties: Lika-Senj

Highway system
- Highways in Croatia

D217 is a state road in central Croatia connecting the D1 state road to Ličko Petrovo Selo border crossing to Bihać, Bosnia and Herzegovina. The road is 3.0 km (1.9 mi) long.

This and indeed all other state roads in Croatia are managed and maintained by Hrvatske ceste, state owned company.

== Traffic volume ==
Traffic is regularly counted and reported by Hrvatske ceste, operator of the road. Substantial seasonal variations of the traffic volume is attributed to summer tourist traffic.

D217 traffic volume
Road	Counting site	AADT	ASDT	Notes
D217	4301 Ličko Petrovo Selo	1,523	2,398	Adjacent to the D1 junction. Average daily traffic figure is provided instead of AADT and ASDT.

== Road junctions and populated areas ==
D217 junctions/populated areas
Type	Slip roads/Notes
	Ličko Petrovo Selo; D1 to Karlovac and Slunj (to the north) and Knin and Sinj (to the south). The western terminus of the road.
	Ličko Petrovo Selo border crossing The road extends to Bihać, Bosnia and Herzegovina. The eastern terminus of the road.
