= Kraljev Vrh, Jakovlje =

Coordinates: 45°57′N 15°55′E

Kraljev Vrh
- Village
- Interactive map of Kraljev Vrh
- Country: Croatia
- County: Zagreb County

Area
  - Total: 7.9 km^{2} (3.1 sq mi)

Population (2021)
  - Total: 605
  - Density: 77/km^{2} (200/sq mi)
- Time zone: UTC+1 (CET)
  - Summer (DST): UTC+2 (CEST)

Kraljev Vrh is a village in Croatia.
