= Korenica =

- Settlement
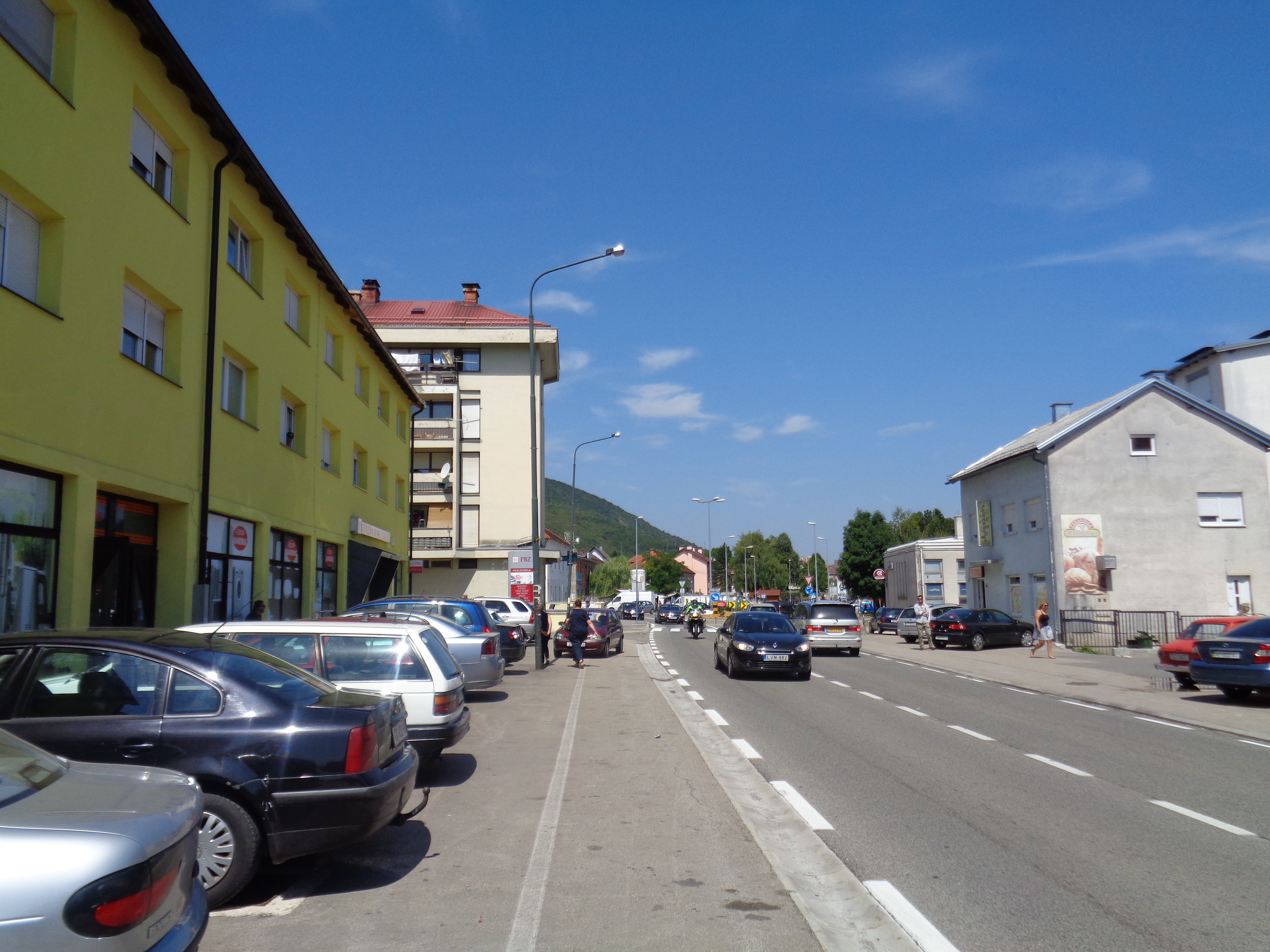

- Location of Korenica
- Coordinates: 44°44′N 15°42′E
- Country: Croatia
- County: Lika-Senj
- Municipality: Plitvička Jezera

Area
  - Total: 1.9 km^{2} (0.73 sq mi)

Population (2021)
  - Total: 1,563
  - Density: 820/km^{2} (2,100/sq mi)
- Time zone: UTC+1 (CET)
  - Summer (DST): UTC+2 (CEST)
- Area code: +385 53

Korenica is a small town in Lika, Croatia, located in the municipality of Plitvička Jezera, on the D1 road between Plitvice and Udbina. According to 2011 census it has 1,766 residents. It is the seat of the Plitvička Jezera Municipality.

In SFR Yugoslavia it was named Titova Korenica after Yugoslav leader Josip Broz Tito. The population consists of local ethnic Croats and Serbs, and there are also Croats from Bosnia who moved to Croatia after the Croatian War for Independence.

Korenica has one elementary school and one high school.

== History ==
The 1712 census of Lika and Krbava records that 119 Vlach (i.e. Serb Orthodox Christian) families live in Korenica.

When the German and Italian Zones of Influence were revised on 24 June 1942, Korenica fell in Zone II, administered civilly by Croatia but militarily by Italy.

Until 1918, Korenica was part of the Austrian monarchy (Kingdom of Croatia-Slavonia, Lika-Krbava County) after the compromise of 1867), in the Croatian Military Frontier, administered by the Kommando Ottotschaner Regiment N°II before 1881. A post-office was opened in 1862.

== Climate ==
Since records began in 1981, the highest temperature recorded at the local weather station was 40.2 °C (104.4 °F), on 2 August 2017. The coldest temperature was −27.3 °C (−17.1 °F), on 13 January 2003.

== Demographics ==
1991 census:

Serbs 1,519 / 88.51%
Yugoslavs 84 / 4.89%
Croats 49 / 2.85%
Albanians 4 / 0.23%
Muslims 3 / 0.17%
Italians 2 / 0.11%
Hungarians 2 / 0.11%
Slovenians 1 / 0.05%
Montenegrins 1 / 0.05%
undeclared 15 / 0.87%
unknown 36 / 2.09%

Historical population 1857–2011
v

population	1947	4628	4067	324	298	352	333	441	304	339	496	829	1299	1716	1570	1776
	1857	1869	1880	1890	1900	1910	1921	1931	1948	1953	1961	1971	1981	1991	2001	2011

Sources: Croatian Bureau of Statistics publications

NOTE: Population figures for the period 1857–1880 also include population figures for the following settlements: Drakulić Rijeka, Gradina Korenička, Homoljac, Jasikovac, Kalebovac, Kompolje Koreničko, Mihaljevac, Oravac, Ponor Korenički, Šeganovac, Vranovača and Vrpile.

== Sights ==
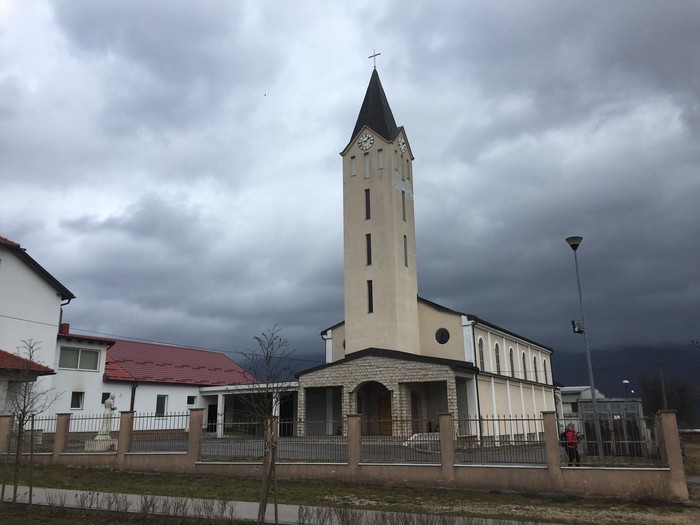
Catholic church

- Saint George's Catholic Church
- Site of the Monument to the fallen partisan soldiers and civilian victims of fascism during the National Liberation War (WWII) from the Lika region, in Bijeli Potoci (destroyed around 2008)
- Ruins of the Serbian Orthodox Church of the Holy Archangels Michael and Gabriel, destroyed in 1943

== Notable people ==
- Vasilije Đerić
- Srđan Žakula

== See also ==
- Lika
- Plitvice Lakes National Park
- Plitvička Jezera

== Bibliography ==
- Trgo, Fabijan, ed. (1964). Zbornik dokumenata i podataka o Narodno-oslobodilačkom ratu Jugoslovenskih naroda. Vol. V, 32.
