= Plitvice =

Plitvice or Plitvička jezera can refer to:

- Plitvice Lakes National Park, the largest and oldest national park in Croatia
- Plitvička Jezera, a municipality of Lika-Senj County, Croatia

== See also ==
- Plitvica (disambiguation)
