= Korana (disambiguation) =

Korana is a river in central Croatia and west Bosnia and Herzegovina

Korana may also refer to:

- Korana language, a South African language
- Korana people or !Ora people, a Europeanised pronunciation of !Orana, a subgroup of South Africa's native people
- Korana, Lika-Senj County, a village near Plitvička Jezera, Croatia
- Korana Longin-Zanze, Croatian basketball player

== See also ==
- Koranna (disambiguation)
