= Plitvica =

Plitvica refers to

- Plitvica, Slovenia, a village near Apače
- Plitvica (river), a tributary of Drava, in northern Croatia
- Plitvica (Korana), a river in central Croatia
- Plitvica Selo, a village in Croatia in the Plitvička Jezera municipality
- Plitvica Voćanska, a village in Croatia in the municipality of Donja Voća
