= Jasikovac =

Jasikovac may refer to:

- Jasikovac, Bosnia and Herzegovina, a village near Teočak and Ugljevik
- Jasikovac, Croatia, a village near Plitvička Jezera
