= Rastovača =

Rastovača may refer to:

- Rastovača, Bosnia and Herzegovina, a village near Posušje
- Rastovača, Croatia, a village near Plitvička Jezera
