= Batinovac =

Lake in Croatia

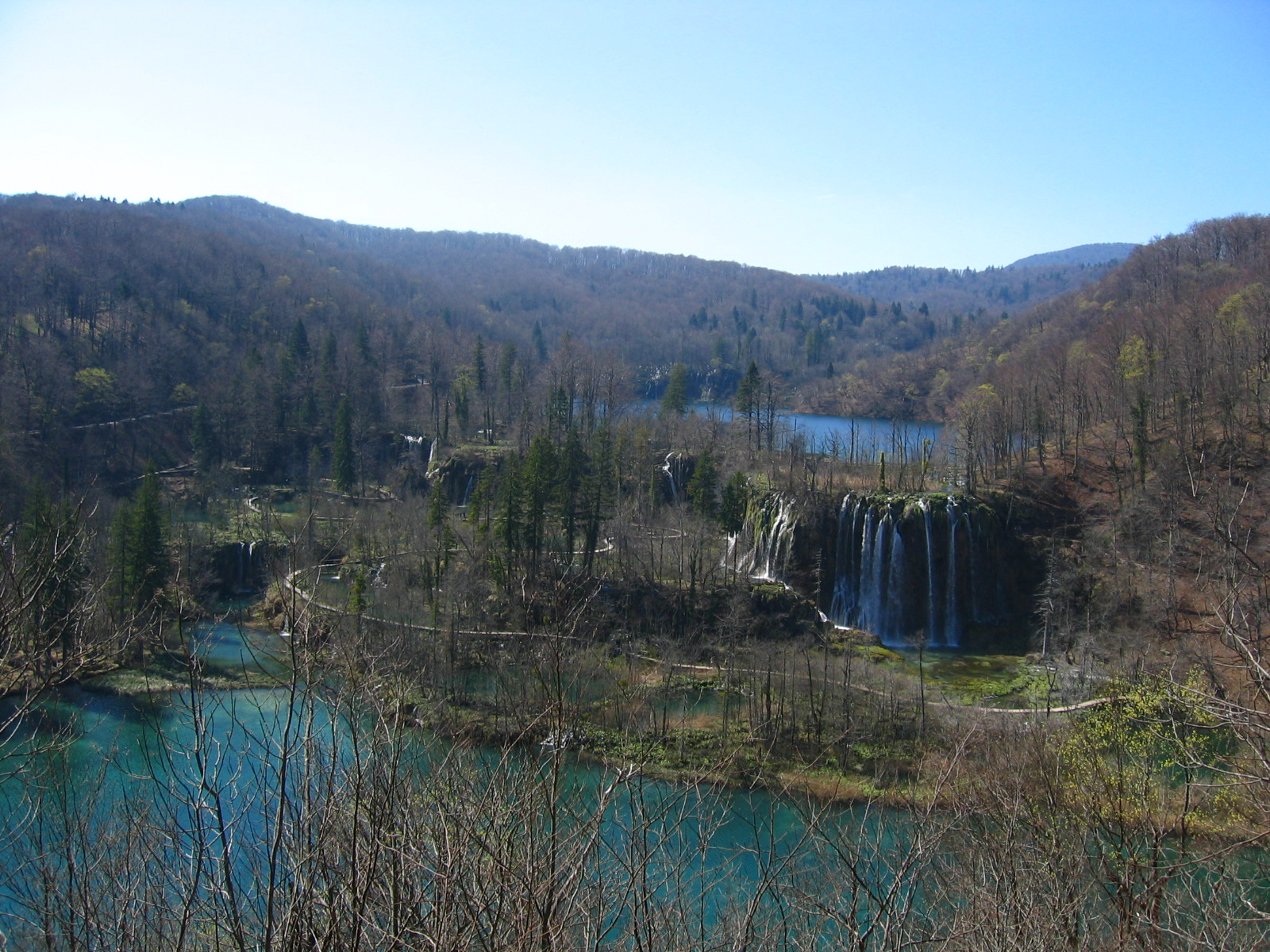
- The upper part shows the waterfall from Lake Batinovac flowing into Lake Galovac, with the Veliki prštavac waterfall in the middle

- Location in Croatia
- Interactive map of Batinovac
- Location: Plitvice Lakes National Park, Lika-Senj County
- Coordinates: 44°52′18″N 15°36′12″E
- Primary inflows: Water from Prošćansko Lake and Okrugljak Lake
- Primary outflows: Lake Galovac and Veliko Lake
- Basin countries: Croatia

Batinovac is a lake located in Plitvice Lakes National Park, part of the Upper Lakes group in Croatia.

== Description ==
The lake is situated at an altitude of 610 meters. It has a surface area of 1.5 hectares and a maximum depth of 5 meters. Its length is 140 meters, and its width is up to 80 meters.

The lake is surrounded by tall beech trees. A well-maintained path passes by a series of smaller waterfalls, where the formation of tufa is visible, created by moss and plants that accumulate limestone.

Batinovac receives water from the upstream Okrugljak Lake and Prošćansko Lake through an old human-made channel. Part of its water flows over a waterfall into Lake Galovac, while the rest spills into smaller lakes located to the north.

Well-marked trails from here lead visitors toward smaller lakes overgrown with reeds and numerous small waterfalls.

The constant sound of water creates a calming atmosphere and allows visitors to enjoy the almost surreal beauty of the surrounding waterfalls. On a clear, sunny day, the experience and scenery leave a lasting impression.

The name "Batinovac" or "Bakinovac" is said to have originated either from a local farmer named Batinić or from an old woman ("baka" in Croatian) who is said to have drowned in the lake.
