= Koranna (disambiguation) =

1505 Koranna is an asteroid.

Koranna may also refer to:

- Koranna people
- Koranna language
- Koranna (cicada), a genus of cicadas

== See also ==
- Korana (disambiguation)
