= Rešetar =

Rešetar may refer to:

- Milan Rešetar (1860–1942), Croatian and Serbian linguist and literary historian
- Rešetar, Croatia, a village near Plitvička Jezera

== See also ==
- Rešetari
