= Čujića Krčevina =

- Village
- Interactive map of Čujića Krčevina
- Location within Croatia
- Coordinates: 44.82221°N 15.66097°E
- Country: Croatia
- County: Lika-Senj
- Municipality: Plitvička Jezera

Area
  - Total: 1.36 sq mi (3.52 km^{2})

Population (2021)
  - Total: 6
  - Density: 4.4/sq mi (1.7/km^{2})
- Time zone: UTC+1 (CET)
  - Summer (DST): UTC+2 (CEST)

Čujića Krčevina is a village in Plitvička Jezera, Croatia. It is connected by the D1 road.
