= Rade Končar =

Croatian Serb politician

- Раде Кончар
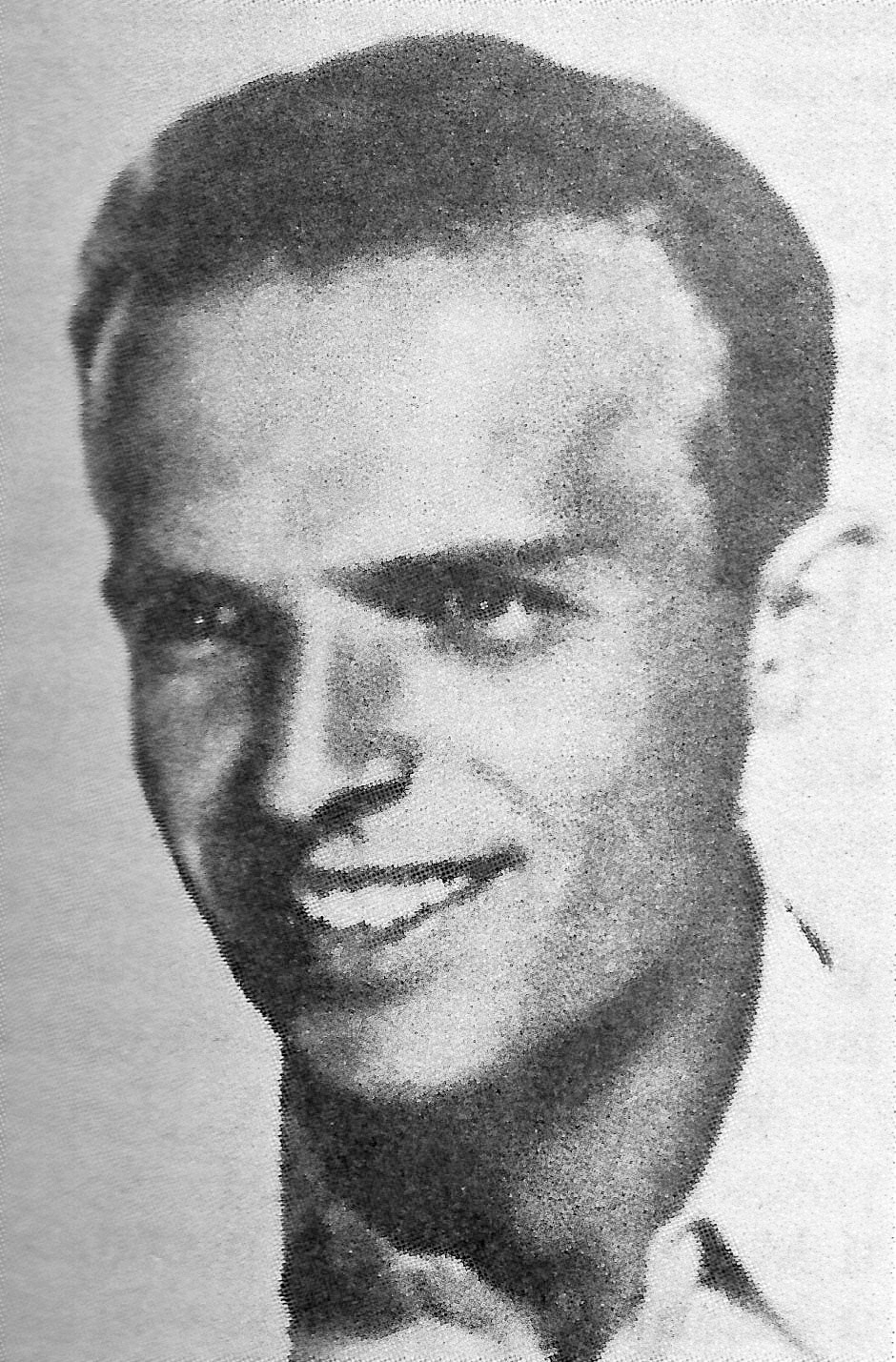

2nd Secretary of the Communist Party of Croatia
- In office 1940 – 22 May 1942
- Preceded by: Đuro Špoljarić
- Succeeded by: Vlado Popović

Personal details
- Born: 6 August 1911 or 28 October 1911 Končarev Kraj, Croatia-Slavonia, Austria-Hungary (modern Croatia)
- Died: 22 May 1942 (aged 30) Sebenico, Governorate of Dalmatia, Kingdom of Italy (modern Šibenik, Croatia)
- Party: Communist Party of Yugoslavia (KPJ); Communist Party of Croatia (KPH)
- Children: 1
- Occupation: Politician; Revolutionary

Military service
- Allegiance: Yugoslav Partisans

Rade Končar (Serbian Cyrillic: Раде Кончар; 6 August or 28 October 1911 – 22 May 1942) was a Croatian Serb politician and leader of the Yugoslav Partisans in the Independent State of Croatia and Dalmatia during the early stages of World War II in Yugoslavia. He became a member of the Communist Party of Yugoslavia (KPJ) in 1934 and was arrested in 1936 when the Belgrade branch of the party was banned by Yugoslav authorities. After serving one year of hard labour in Sremska Mitrovica prison he was released and elected political secretary of the central committee of the Communist Party of Croatia (KPH) in Zagreb. In October 1940, he was made a member of the central committee of the KPJ at the Fifth National Conference of the Communist Party of Yugoslavia.

Following the April 1941 Axis occupation of Yugoslavia Končar took part in the anti-fascist uprising which retook areas from German control in Serbia, and personally led attacks against Axis forces in Independent State of Croatia. Having relocated to Governorate of Dalmatia in October 1941, in November 1941 he was ambushed by fascist agents, arrested and beaten. The Ustaše disclosed his identity to Italian authorities who then put him on trial. Končar was sentenced to death and executed alongside twenty-five others on 22 May 1942 in Šibenik.

He was posthumously named the first People's Hero of Yugoslavia and was revered as a war hero.

== Early life ==
Rade Končar was born in the village of Končarev Kraj in Plitvička Jezera, near the town of Korenica. Some sources give his birthdate as 28 October 1911, while others state that he was born on 6 August 1911. A Serb from Croatia, Končar moved to the Serbian town of Leskovac where he finished school and became a metal worker. He became a member of the Communist Party of Yugoslavia (KPJ) in Belgrade in 1934. In 1936, the Belgrade branch of the party was outlawed by the authorities of the Kingdom of Yugoslavia. Končar was arrested and imprisoned for one year of hard labour, which he spent in Sremska Mitrovica prison. Upon being released, he moved to Zagreb and began working for Siemens. He formed a Communist movement in the city and organized a successful strike in 1938. That same year, he was elected to membership of the Communist party committee in Zagreb and to be the political secretary of the central committee of the Communist Party of Croatia (KPH). Končar was inaugurated as political secretary at the first conference of the KPH and was made a member of the central committee of the KPJ at the Fifth National Conference of the Communist Party of Yugoslavia in October 1940. He played an important role in the party's leadership due to his worker's background and contributed greatly to the strengthening of the party organization. In January 1941, he was named the head of the Regional committee of KPJ for Serbia.

== World War II ==
With the Axis occupation of Yugoslavia in April 1941, Končar moved to Zagreb on 8 April 1941. He became involved in planning a national anti-fascist revolt throughout the country and extended resistance actions to Independent State of Croatia despite encountering great difficulties. He personally organized diversions in Zagreb, including the September 1941 sabotage at the General Post Office in Zagreb. Later the same month, he participated in Stolice conference of Partisan commanders and representatives in the Serbian village of Stolice. Having participated in retaking areas of Serbia from the Germans, Končar was tasked with forming the General Staff Headquarters of the Yugoslav Partisans in Croatia. He went to Governorate of Dalmatia in October 1941 to work on improving the organization of Communist forces there and helping them gain momentum against the Axis. He personally organized many attacks against Axis forces in the city of Split.

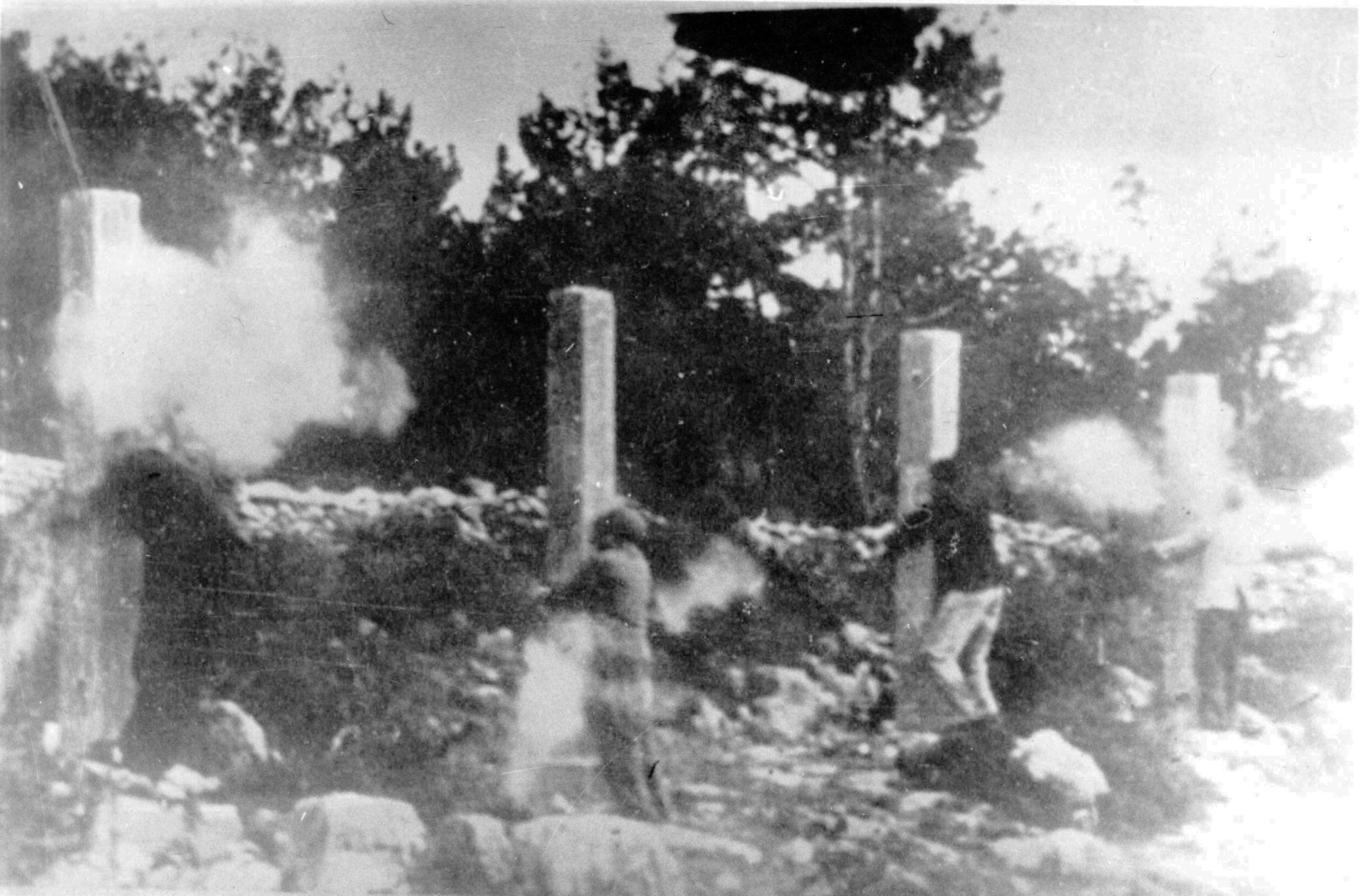
Death of Rade Končar and his comrades

On 17 November 1941, returning from a trip to Šibenik, he discovered anti-Communist agents waiting to ambush him at his Split apartment. He was arrested and beaten before being taken to hospital. The Ustaše informed Italian authorities that Končar was an important prisoner. The Italians put him on trial in Šibenik, where he was sentenced to death. He was executed by firing squad on 22 May 1942. Twenty-five of his colleagues were killed alongside him.

== Legacy ==
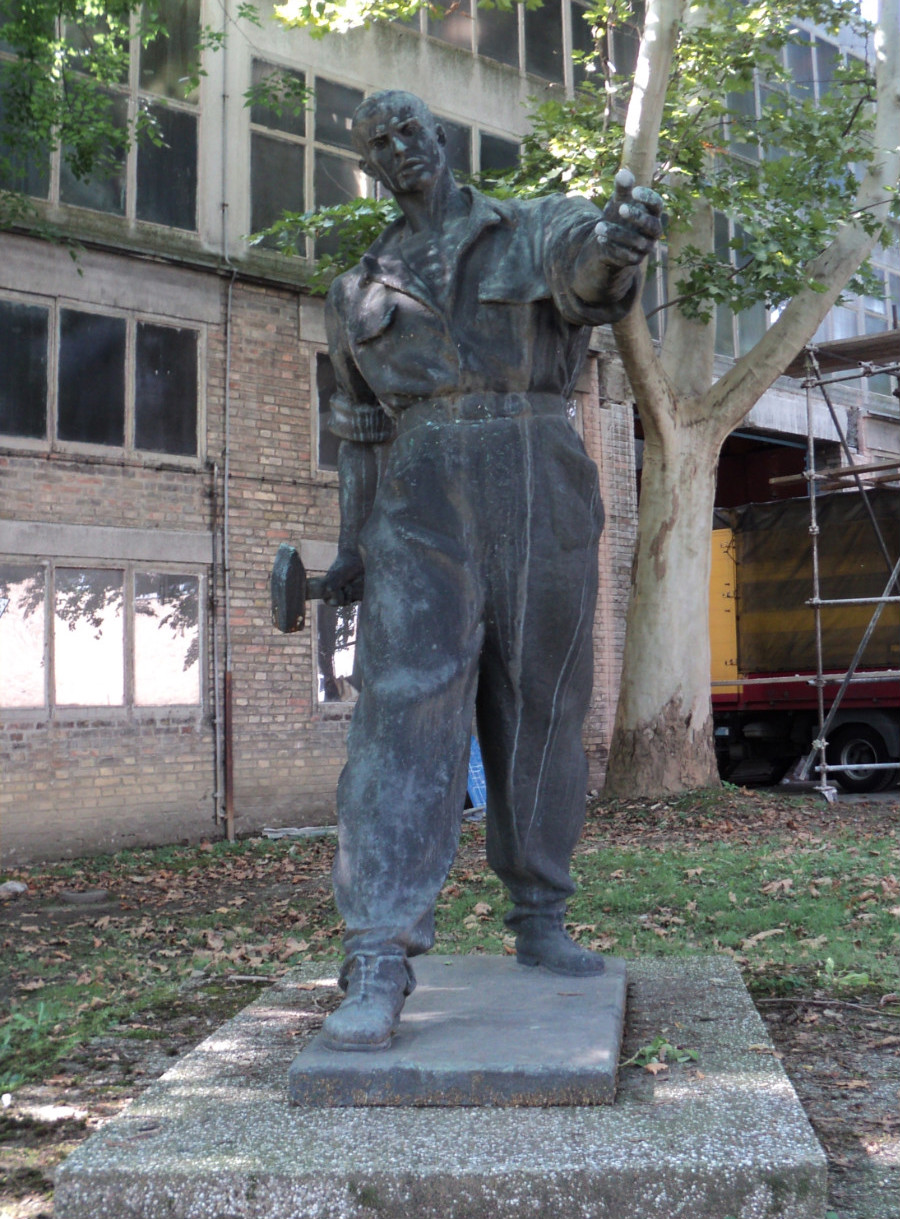
Monument to Končar, designed by Vanja Radauš, stands in Zagreb

Končar was proclaimed a People's Hero of Yugoslavia by the Communists. The August 1942 issue of Proleter named him first on the list of the first ten People's Heroes. He quickly became one of the greatest Partisan icons. The later conventional depiction of his sentencing and execution says that, when asked whether he would ask for clemency, Končar said Milosti ne tražim, niti bih vam je dao ("I do not ask for mercy, nor would I have it on you"); when they aimed their guns at his back, he said Kukavice, pucajte u prsa ("Shoot [me] in the chest, cowards!").

A military unit of the Yugoslav Partisans, the 13th Proletarian Brigade Rade Končar, was named after him and fought on the Yugoslav Front. It was composed primarily of Croats, most of whom were Roman Catholic. Končar was the only ethnic Serb leader of the SKH until the election of Stanko Stojčević in 1988. His only son, also named Rade Končar, was a prominent politician in post-war Yugoslavia.

Rade Končar Enterprise, today the Končar Group, was the largest producer of electrical equipment in Yugoslavia during the 1970s. The Electrical Engineering Highschool "Rade Končar" in Belgrade is also named after him. Končar-class missile boat of former Yugoslav Navy was also named after him.

In November 2018, a 65-year-old man was injured after he attempted to topple a bust of Končar in the city of Split. Media reported the man saying it was his political statement based in prejudice.

== Notes ==
Party political offices
Preceded by Đuro Špoljarić	Secretary of the Central Committee of the Communist Party of Croatia; 1940 – 22 May 1942	Succeeded by Vlado Popović
