= Sertić Poljana =

- Village
- Interactive map of Sertić Poljana
- Location within Croatia
- Coordinates: 44.92488°N 15.56688°E
- Country: Croatia
- County: Lika-Senj
- Municipality: Plitvička Jezera

Area
  - Total: 2.84 sq mi (7.35 km^{2})

Population (2021)
  - Total: 4
  - Density: 1.4/sq mi (0.54/km^{2})
- Time zone: UTC+1 (CET)
  - Summer (DST): UTC+2 (CEST)

Sertić Poljana is a village in Plitvička Jezera, Croatia. It is connected by the D42 road.
