= Rudanovac =

- Village
- Interactive map of Rudanovac
- Location within Croatia
- Coordinates: 44.78228°N 15.68229°E
- Country: Croatia
- County: Lika-Senj
- Municipality: Plitvička Jezera

Area
  - Total: 2.81 sq mi (7.28 km^{2})

Population (2021)
  - Total: 93
  - Density: 33/sq mi (13/km^{2})
- Time zone: UTC+1 (CET)
  - Summer (DST): UTC+2 (CEST)

Rudanovac is a village in Plitvička Jezera, Croatia. It is connected by the D1 road.
