= Jezerce, Croatia =

Coordinates: 44°53′N 15°37′E

Jezerce Језерце
- Village
- Interactive map of Jezerce
- Country: Croatia
- County: Lika-Senj
- Municipality: Plitvička Jezera

Area
  - Total: 10.5 km^{2} (4.1 sq mi)

Population (2021)
  - Total: 230
  - Density: 22/km^{2} (57/sq mi)
- Time zone: UTC+1 (CET)
  - Summer (DST): UTC+2 (CEST)

Jezerce (Serbian Cyrillic: Језерце) is a village in Plitvička Jezera, Croatia. It is located near the famous Plitvice Lakes National Park, and has many hotels related to the sights.
