= Kapela Korenička =

- Village
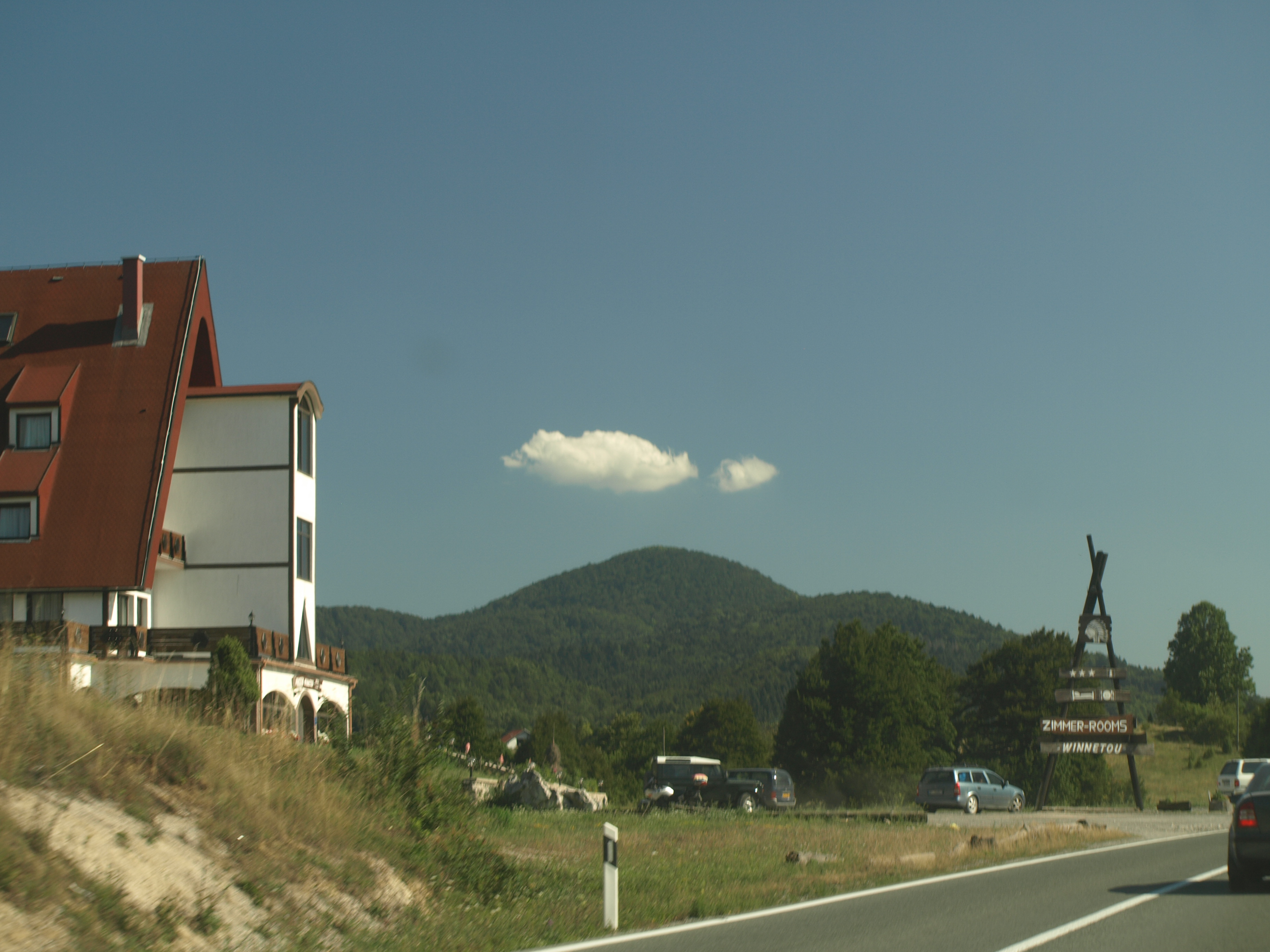
- Interactive map of Kapela Korenička
- Location within Croatia
- Coordinates: 44.80790°N 15.67655°E
- Country: Croatia
- County: Lika-Senj
- Municipality: Plitvička Jezera

Area
  - Total: 7.53 sq mi (19.49 km^{2})

Population (2021)
  - Total: 11
  - Density: 1.5/sq mi (0.56/km^{2})
- Time zone: UTC+1 (CET)
  - Summer (DST): UTC+2 (CEST)

Kapela Korenička is a village in Plitvička Jezera, Croatia. It is connected by the D1 road.
