= Plitvički Ljeskovac =

- Village
- Interactive map of Plitvički Ljeskovac
- Location within Croatia
- Coordinates: 44.84326°N 15.60120°E
- Country: Croatia
- County: Lika-Senj
- Municipality: Plitvička Jezera

Population (2021)
  - Total: 16
- Time zone: UTC+1 (CET)
  - Summer (DST): UTC+2 (CEST)

Plitvički Ljeskovac is a village in Plitvička Jezera, Croatia. It is connected by the D52 and D429 roads.
