= Jasikovac, Bosnia and Herzegovina =

Jasikovac
- Village
- Location within Bosnia and Herzegovina
- Coordinates: 44.6215°N 18.9703°E
- Country: Bosnia and Herzegovina
- Entity: Federation of Bosnia and Herzegovina
- Region Canton: Bijeljina; Tuzla
- Municipality: Ugljevik; Teočak

Area
  - Total: 2.79 sq mi (7.22 km^{2})

Population (2013)
  - Total: 1,058
  - Density: 380/sq mi (147/km^{2})
- Time zone: UTC+1 (CET)
  - Summer (DST): UTC+2 (CEST)

Jasikovac is a village in the municipalities of Ugljevik (Republika Srpska) and Teočak, in northeastern Bosnia and Herzegovina

== War Inpact ==
According to testimony from the local imam, the village endured severe wartime devastation, with reports indicating that the Republika Srpska army left no structurally sound residences standing in Jasikovac.

== Demographics ==
According to the 2013 census, its population was 1,058, with 119 living in the Ugljevik part, and 939 in the Teočak part.

Ethnicity in 2013
Ethnicity	Number	Percentage
Bosniaks	1,050	99.2%
Serbs	7	0.7%
Croats	1	0.1%
Total	1,058	100%
