= Mihaljevac =

- Village
- Interactive map of Mihaljevac
- Location within Croatia
- Coordinates: 44.76867°N 15.71740°E
- Country: Croatia
- County: Lika-Senj
- Municipality: Plitvička Jezera

Area
  - Total: 3.29 sq mi (8.51 km^{2})

Population (2021)
  - Total: 22
  - Density: 6.7/sq mi (2.6/km^{2})
- Time zone: UTC+1 (CET)
  - Summer (DST): UTC+2 (CEST)

Mihaljevac is a village in Plitvička Jezera, Croatia. It is connected by the D1 road.
