= Korana, Lika-Senj County =

Korana
- Village
- Interactive map of Korana
- Location within Croatia
- Coordinates: 44.908°N 15.609°E
- Country: Croatia
- County: Lika-Senj
- Municipality: Plitvička Jezera

Area
  - Total: 3.83 sq mi (9.93 km^{2})

Population (2021)
  - Total: 43
  - Density: 11/sq mi (4.3/km^{2})
- Time zone: UTC+1 (CET)
  - Summer (DST): UTC+2 (CEST)

Korana is a village in Plitvička Jezera, Croatia. It is connected by the D429 road.

Its name was derived from the Korana River.
