= Rešetar, Croatia =

Rešetar
- Village
- Interactive map of Rešetar
- Location within Croatia
- Coordinates: 44.89844°N 15.70220°E
- Country: Croatia
- County: Lika-Senj
- Municipality: Plitvička Jezera

Area
  - Total: 3.55 sq mi (9.20 km^{2})

Population (2021)
  - Total: 31
  - Density: 8.7/sq mi (3.4/km^{2})
- Time zone: UTC+1 (CET)
  - Summer (DST): UTC+2 (CEST)

Rešetar is a village in Plitvička Jezera, Croatia. It is connected by the D1 road.
