= Oravac =

- Village
- Interactive map of Oravac
- Location within Croatia
- Coordinates: 44.722°N 15.710°E
- Country: Croatia
- County: Lika-Senj
- Municipality: Plitvička Jezera

Area
  - Total: 1.11 sq mi (2.88 km^{2})

Population (2021)
  - Total: 21
  - Density: 19/sq mi (7.3/km^{2})
- Time zone: UTC+1 (CET)
  - Summer (DST): UTC+2 (CEST)

Oravac is a village in Plitvička Jezera, Croatia. It is connected by the D1 road.
