= Kompolje Koreničko =

- Village
- Interactive map of Kompolje Koreničko
- Location within Croatia
- Coordinates: 44.750°N 15.712°E
- Country: Croatia
- County: Lika-Senj
- Municipality: Plitvička Jezera

Area
  - Total: 0.97 sq mi (2.50 km^{2})

Population (2021)
  - Total: 110
  - Density: 110/sq mi (44/km^{2})
- Time zone: UTC+1 (CET)
  - Summer (DST): UTC+2 (CEST)

Kompolje Koreničko is a village in Plitvička Jezera, Croatia. It is connected by the D1 road.

== History ==
Kompolje Koreničko contains multiple archaeological heritage sites such as Crkvina, the site of a 15th-century medieval sacred building, and Kulina, the site of a 15th-18th century fortified castle.

== See also ==
- List of archaeological heritage sites in Plitvička Jezera
