= Končarev Kraj =

- Village
- Location in Croatia
- Coordinates: 44°49′45″N 15°34′00″E
- Country: Croatia
- Region: Adriatic Croatia
- County: Lika-Senj
- Municipality: Plitvička Jezera

Area
  - Total: 9.9 km^{2} (3.8 sq mi)
- Elevation: 796 m (2,612 ft)

Population (2021)
  - Total: 1
  - Density: 0.10/km^{2} (0.26/sq mi)
- Time zone: UTC+1 (CET)
  - Summer (DST): UTC+2 (CEST)
- Postal code: 53231 Plitvička Jezera
- Area code: (+385) 53

Končarev Kraj is a village in central Croatia, in the municipality of Plitvička Jezera, Lika-Senj County. It is connected by the D1 highway. It is a birthplace of Rade Končar, Croatian Serb antifascist, communist and People's Hero of Yugoslavia.

== Demographics ==
Population change 1857-2011
v

population				92	138	139	132	120	101	105	52	23	15	12		1
	1857	1869	1880	1890	1900	1910	1921	1931	1948	1953	1961	1971	1981	1991	2001	2011

Sources: Croatian Bureau of Statistics publications

== Notable natives and residents ==
- Rade Končar (1911–1942) - antifascist, communist and People's Hero of Yugoslavia
