= Vranovača =

Coordinates: 44°45′27″N 15°41′49″E

- Village
- Interactive map of Vranovača
- Country: Croatia
- County: Lika-Senj
- Municipality: Plitvička Jezera

Area
  - Total: 2.7 sq mi (7.0 km^{2})

Population (2021)
  - Total: 132
  - Density: 49/sq mi (19/km^{2})
- Time zone: UTC+1 (CET)
  - Summer (DST): UTC+2 (CEST)

Vranovača (Serbian Cyrillic: Врановача) is a village in Plitvička Jezera, Croatia. It is connected by the D1 highway.

== History ==
Vranovača contains an archaeological heritage site named Mrsinjgrad, which is the site of a medieval fortress.

== See also ==
- List of archaeological heritage sites in Plitvička Jezera
