= Rastovača, Croatia =

Rastovača
- Village
- Interactive map of Rastovača
- Location within Croatia
- Coordinates: 44.90541°N 15.61203°E
- Country: Croatia
- County: Lika-Senj
- Municipality: Plitvička Jezera

Area
  - Total: 5.96 sq mi (15.43 km^{2})

Population (2021)
  - Total: 78
  - Density: 13/sq mi (5.1/km^{2})
- Time zone: UTC+1 (CET)
  - Summer (DST): UTC+2 (CEST)

Rastovača is a village in Plitvička Jezera, Croatia. It is connected by the D429 road, which runs straight through the village.
