= Ponor Korenički =

- Village
- Location within Croatia
- Coordinates: 44°43′59″N 15°45′55″E
- Country: Croatia
- County: Lika-Senj
- Municipality: Plitvička Jezera

Area
  - Total: 9.2 km^{2} (3.6 sq mi)

Population (2021)
  - Total: 1
  - Density: 0.11/km^{2} (0.28/sq mi)
- Time zone: UTC+1 (CET)
  - Summer (DST): UTC+2 (CEST)
- Postal code: 53230
- Area code: + (385)

Ponor Korenički is a village in Plitvička Jezera municipality in Lika-Senj County, Croatia.
