= Vrpile =

- Village
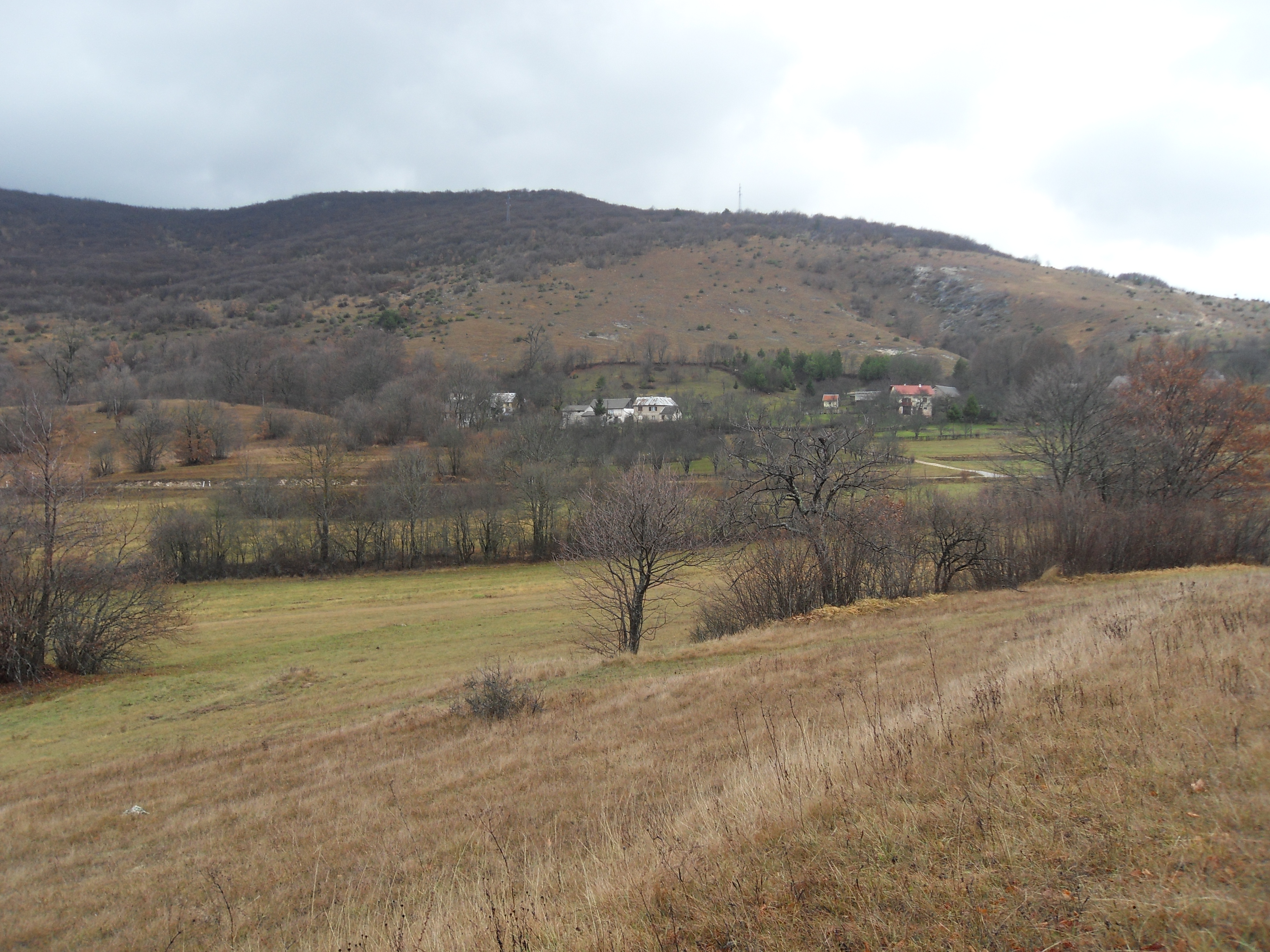
- Interactive map of Vrpile
- Location within Croatia
- Coordinates: 44.72218°N 15.69157°E
- Country: Croatia
- County: Lika-Senj
- Municipality: Plitvička Jezera

Area
  - Total: 2.29 sq mi (5.92 km^{2})

Population (2021)
  - Total: 7
  - Density: 3.1/sq mi (1.2/km^{2})
- Time zone: UTC+1 (CET)
  - Summer (DST): UTC+2 (CEST)

Vrpile is a village in Plitvička Jezera, Croatia. It is connected by the D25 road.
