= Plitvica Selo =

- Village
- Interactive map of Plitvica Selo
- Location within Croatia
- Coordinates: 44.89881°N 15.59854°E
- Country: Croatia
- County: Lika-Senj
- Municipality: Plitvička Jezera

Area
  - Total: 4.83 sq mi (12.52 km^{2})

Population (2021)
  - Total: 50
  - Density: 10/sq mi (4.0/km^{2})
- Time zone: UTC+1 (CET)
  - Summer (DST): UTC+2 (CEST)

Plitvica Selo is a village in Plitvička Jezera, Croatia. It is connected by the D42 road.
