= Drakulić Rijeka =

- Village
- Interactive map of Drakulić Rijeka
- Location within Croatia
- Coordinates: 44.79257°N 15.64916°E
- Country: Croatia
- County: Lika-Senj
- Municipality: Plitvička Jezera

Area
  - Total: 1.31 sq mi (3.38 km^{2})

Population (2021)
  - Total: 6
  - Density: 4.6/sq mi (1.8/km^{2})
- Time zone: UTC+1 (CET)
  - Summer (DST): UTC+2 (CEST)

Drakulić Rijeka is a village in Plitvička Jezera, Croatia. It is connected by the D52 road.
