= Šeganovac =

- Village
- Interactive map of Šeganovac
- Location within Croatia
- Coordinates: 44.75367°N 15.73732°E
- Country: Croatia
- County: Lika-Senj
- Municipality: Plitvička Jezera

Area
  - Total: 7.07 sq mi (18.30 km^{2})

Population (2021)
  - Total: 7
  - Density: 0.99/sq mi (0.38/km^{2})
- Time zone: UTC+1 (CET)
  - Summer (DST): UTC+2 (CEST)

Šeganovac is a village in Plitvička Jezera, Croatia. It is connected by the D1 road.

== History ==
Šeganovac contains an archaeological heritage site named Kovrčni brdeljak.

== See also ==
- List of archaeological heritage sites in Plitvička Jezera
