= Kalebovac =

- Village
- Interactive map of Kalebovac
- Location within Croatia
- Coordinates: 44.737°N 15.709°E
- Country: Croatia
- County: Lika-Senj
- Municipality: Plitvička Jezera

Area
  - Total: 0.39 sq mi (1.01 km^{2})

Population (2021)
  - Total: 37
  - Density: 95/sq mi (37/km^{2})
- Time zone: UTC+1 (CET)
  - Summer (DST): UTC+2 (CEST)

Kalebovac is a village in Plitvička Jezera, Croatia. It is connected by the D25 Road.
