= Plitvice Lakes National Park =

National park in Croatia

- Croatian: Nacionalni park Plitvička jezera pronounced [plîtʋitse]
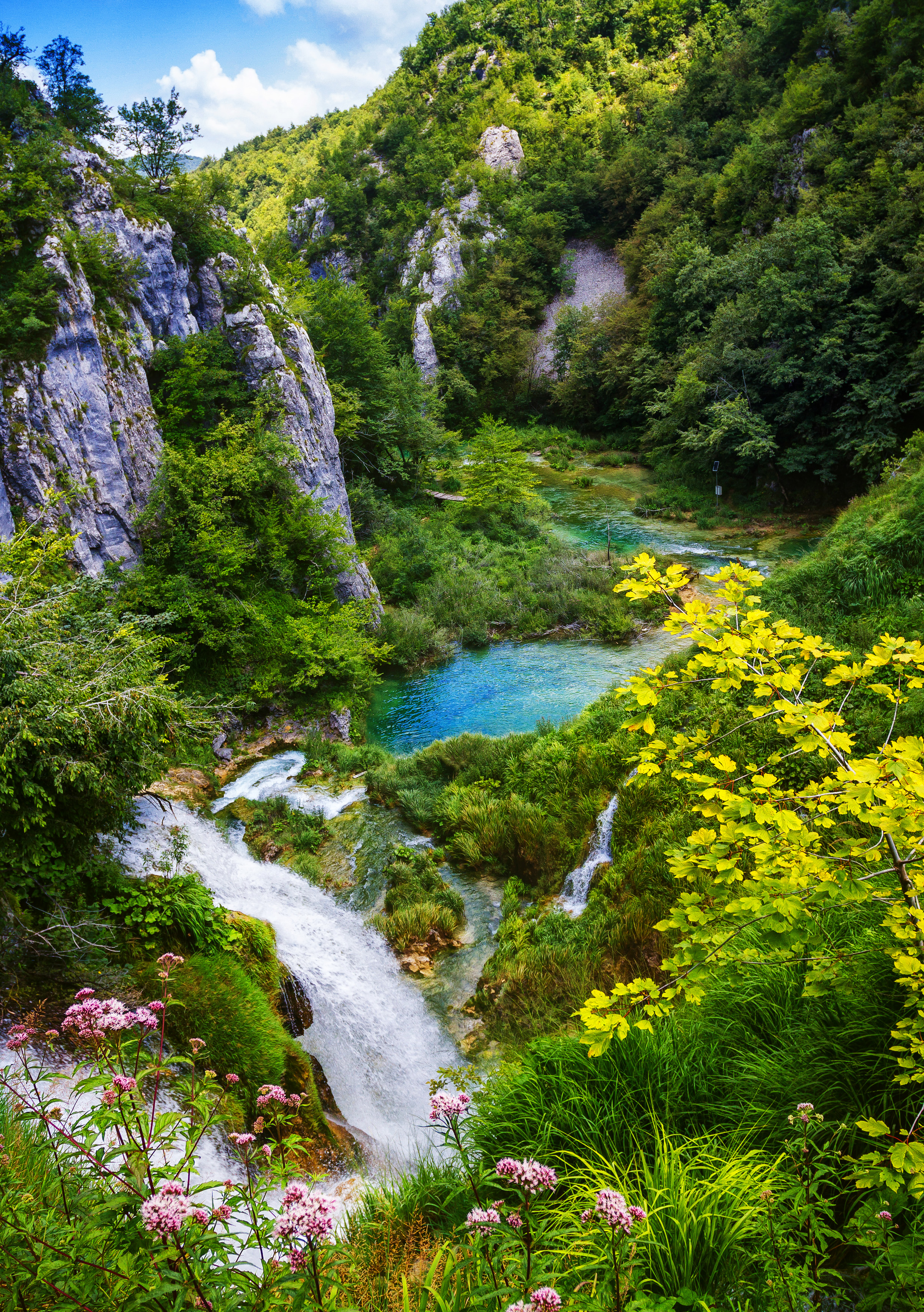
- The large waterfall

- Location within Croatia
- Interactive map of Plitvice Lakes National Park
- 44°52′50″N 15°36′58″E
- Location: Lika-Senj County, Karlovac County, Croatia

Site notes
- Elevation: 367 m (1,204 ft)
- Area: 296.85 km^{2} (114.61 sq mi)
- Governing body: Javna ustanova Nacionalni park Plitvička jezera
- Visitors: 1,492,994 (in 2024)

UNESCO World Heritage Site
- Type: Natural
- Criteria: vii, viii, ix
- Designated: 1979 (3rd Session)
- Reference no.: 98
- Extensions: 2000
- Endangered: 1992–1997

IUCN Category II (National Park)
- Type: Natural
- Designated: 1979

Protected Natural Value of Croatia
- Official name: Nacionalni park Plitvička jezera
- Designated: April 8, 1949

Plitvice Lakes National Park is one of the oldest and largest national parks in Croatia. In 1979, Plitvice Lakes National Park was inscribed on the UNESCO World Heritage list, for its outstanding and picturesque series of tufa lakes, caves, and connected waterfalls.

The national park was founded in 1949 and is in the mountainous karst area of central Croatia, at the border with Bosnia and Herzegovina. The important north–south road that passes through the national park area connects the Croatian inland with the Adriatic coastal region.

The protected area extends over 296.85 km^{2} (114.61 sq mi). About 90% of this area is part of Lika-Senj County, while the remaining 10% is part of Karlovac County.

== Area ==
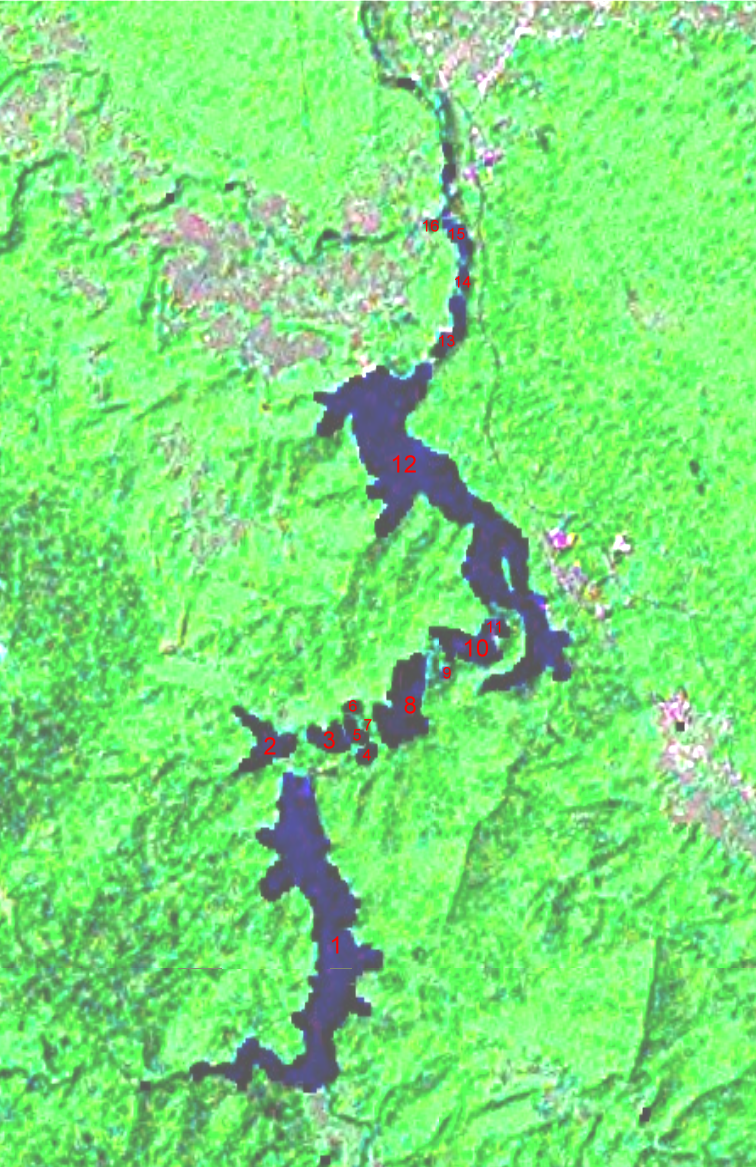
View of the lakes on a satellite image

The national park's lakes are arranged in cascades. Sixteen lakes can be seen from the surface. The lakes are renowned for their distinctive colors, ranging from azure to green, grey or blue. The colors change constantly depending on the quantity of minerals or organisms in the water and the angle of sunlight.

== Etymology ==
The name Plitvice was first mentioned in a written document in 1777 by Dominik Vukasović, the priest of Otočac. This name was designated because of natural phenomena that have created the lakes. Nature formed shallow basins (Croatian pličina or plitvak, plitko means "shallow"), which filled with water. For centuries, water has changed the limestone and thus the landscape of this area. The emerging travertine barriers decelerated and retained the flowing water. These dams are continuously growing in height.

== Location ==
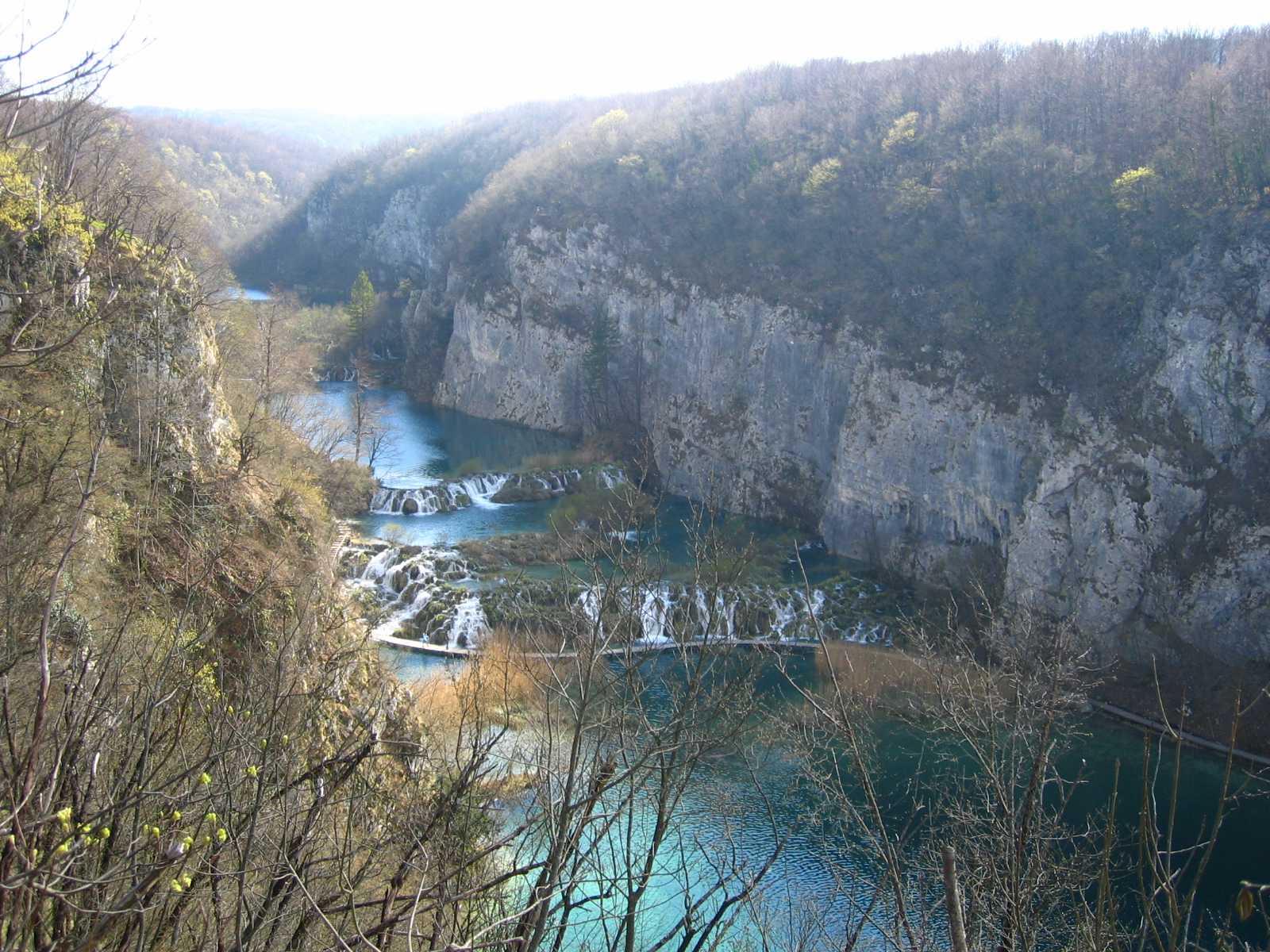
Lower Lakes canyon

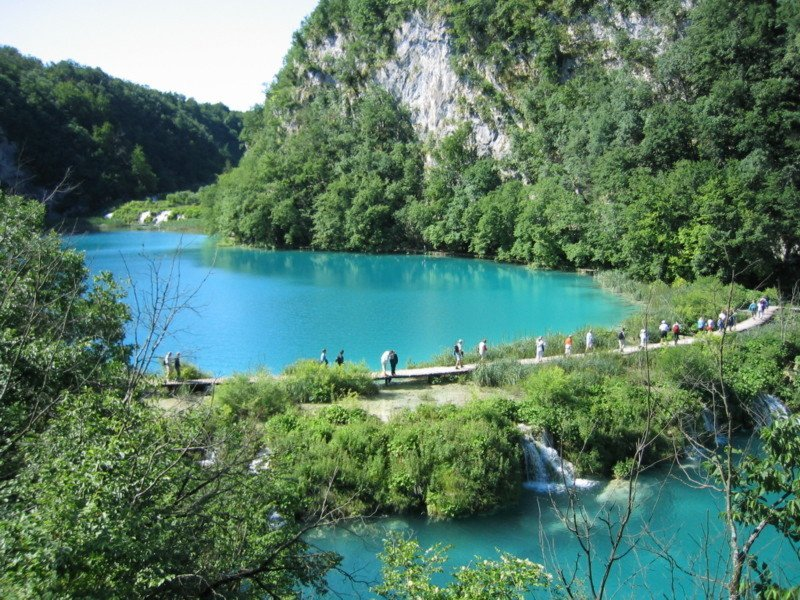
Path between the lakes

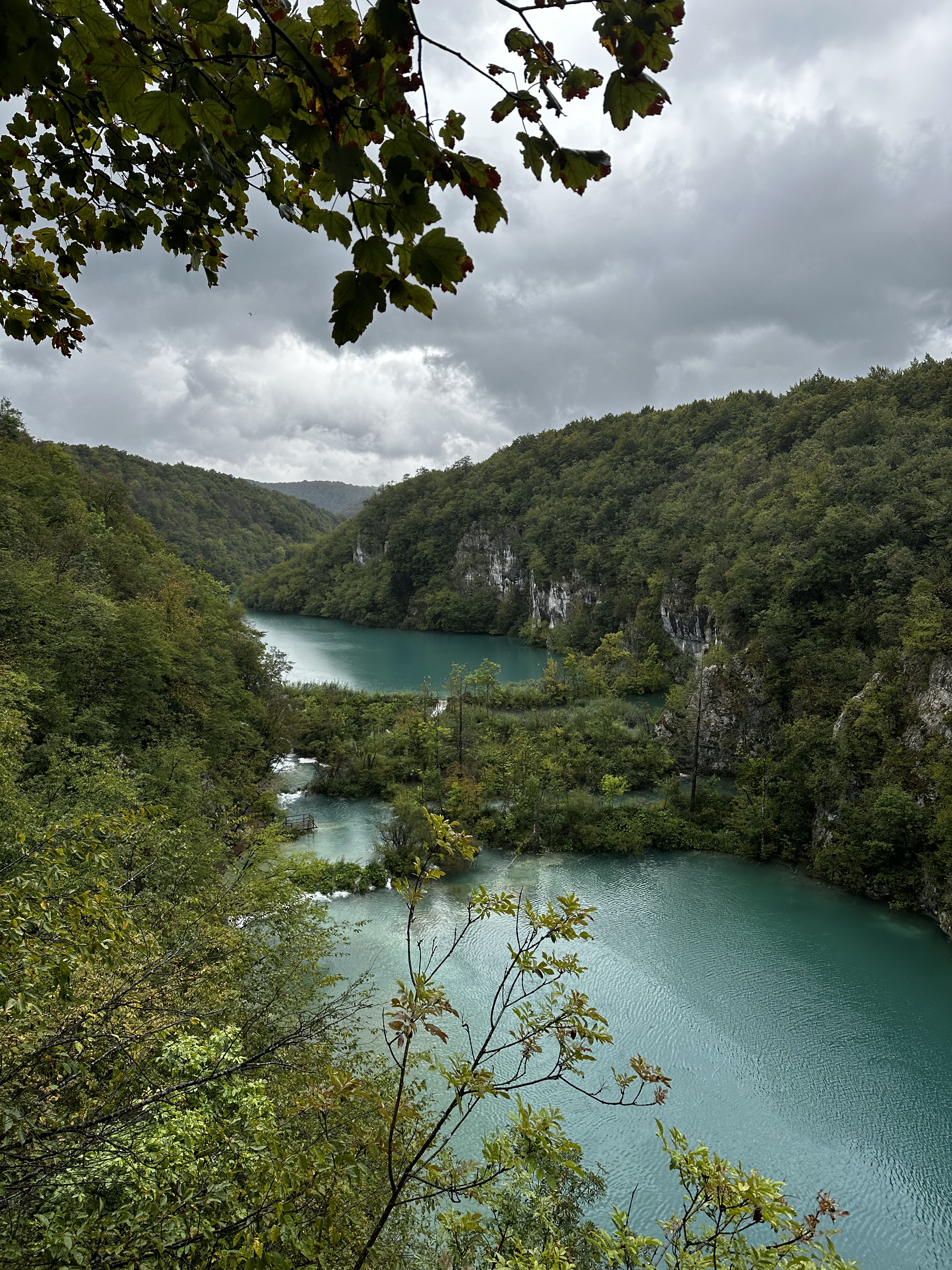
Gavanovac Lake, one of the four Lower Lakes in Plitvice

=== Routes and distances ===
The area of Plitvice Lakes National Park extends across two political subdivisions or counties (Croatian županija). Its 296.85 km^{2} (114.61 sq mi) area is divided between Lika-Senj County (90.7 percent) and Karlovac County (9.3 percent), hence the national park authority is under national jurisdiction. The overall water body area is about 2 km^{2} (0.77 sq mi). The two largest lakes, Prošćansko jezero and Kozjak, cover about 80 percent of the overall water body area. These lakes are also the deepest, with a depth of 37 and 47 m (121 and 154 ft) respectively. None of the other lakes in the park exceed 25 m (82 ft) in depth. The elevation drop from the first lake to the last is 133 m (436 ft).

== Topography and geology ==
=== Terrain ===
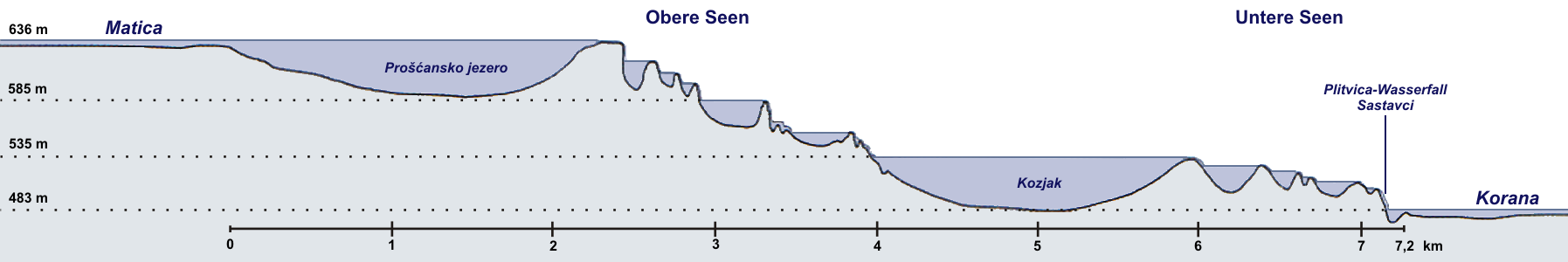
Cross-section

The availability of water, influenced by the configuration of the terrain, has a great impact on the biodiversity of this area. The Plitvice Lakes are surrounded by various mountains. The western side of the national park area is enclosed by the Mala Kapela mountain, while the eastern side is enclosed by the Lička Plješivica mountain, which also represents the border with Bosnia and Herzegovina. Plitvice Lakes National Park is situated in the Plitvice plateau which is surrounded by three mountains that are part of the Dinaric Alps: Lička Plješivica mountain (Gola Plješevica peak 1,640 m), Mala Kapela mountain (Seliški Vrh peak at 1,280 m), and Medveđak (884 m). The afforested mountain slopes serve as reservoirs. They are also a refuge for many animal species. The large difference in altitude in a narrow space between the mountains in the south and the Korana river in the north represents a significant criterion for biodiversity in this region. The overall difference in elevation within the national park area is 912 m (the highest elevation is Seliški vrh at 1279 m, the lowest elevation is reached at 367 m at the bridge across the Korana river).

=== Rivers ===
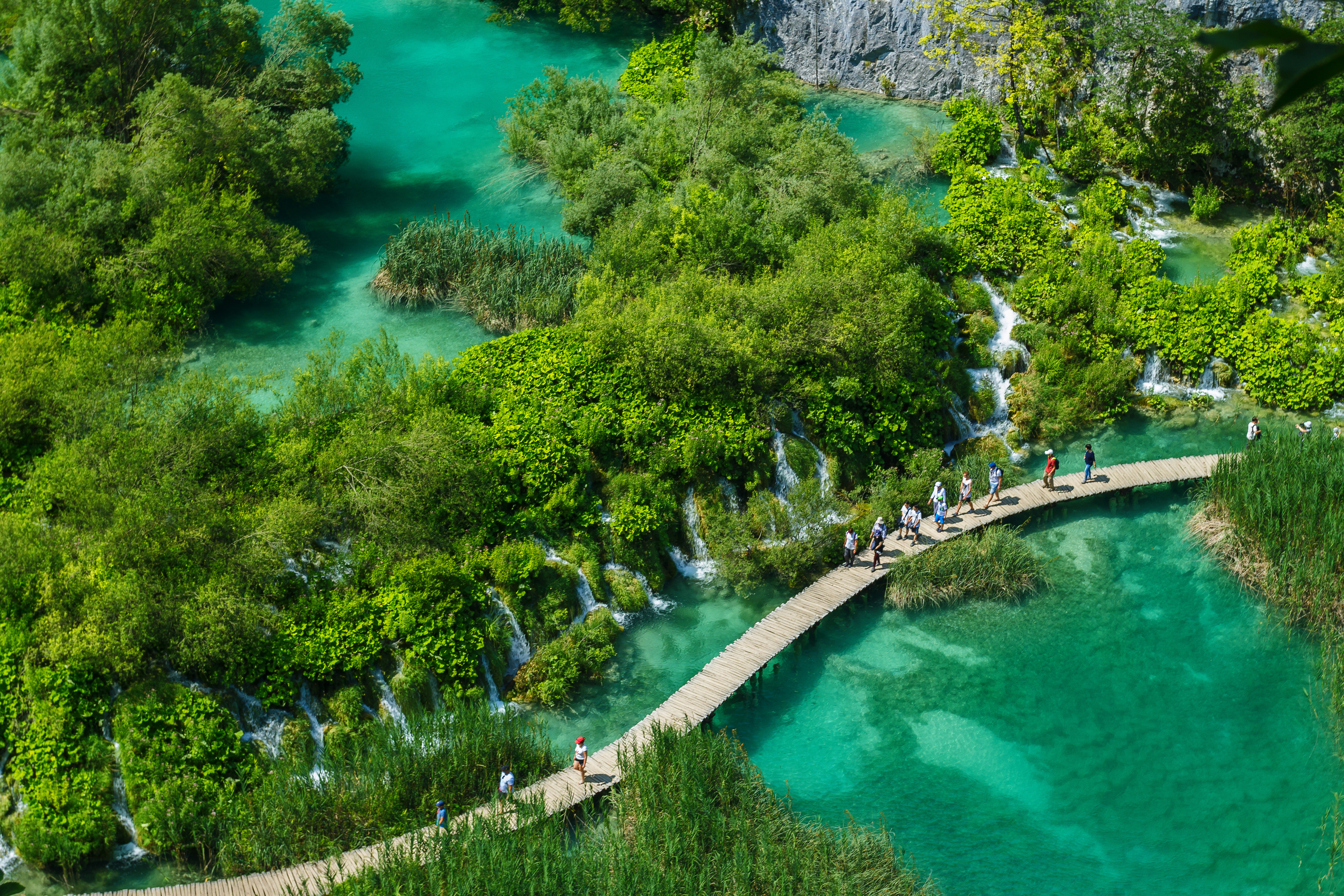
Bridge over a river with small waterfall

The Plitvice Lakes originate in the south of the park area at the confluence of Bijela Rijeka ("White River'") and Crna Rijeka ("Black River"). These rivers originate south of the municipality of Plitvički Ljeskovac and unite at one of the bridges in this village. From this place onwards to the lakes, the water masses are referred to as Matica (English for "water current", can also mean "root" or "origin"). At the bay of Liman (also called Limun), a part of Prošćansko jezero, another small river flows into the lakes. This river is fed by permanent springs; the water quantity, however, varies. Temporarily, water from other, usually dry, creeks reaches Prošćansko jezero from the west.

=== Properties of the underground ===
Tufa sediments have been formed from the Pleistocene onwards in sinkholes or depressed areas between the surrounding mountains. Generally seen, the underground of the Plitvice Lakes could be categorized into two zones. The Upper Lakes in the south predominantly consist of dolomite rock. The Lower lakes in the north predominantly consist of limestone rock. Dolomite rock is slightly harder than limestone. Though fragile upon physical influence, dolomite rock has lower water permeability properties. In contrast, limestone rock is more compact and massive, but has a higher water permeability.

== Climate ==
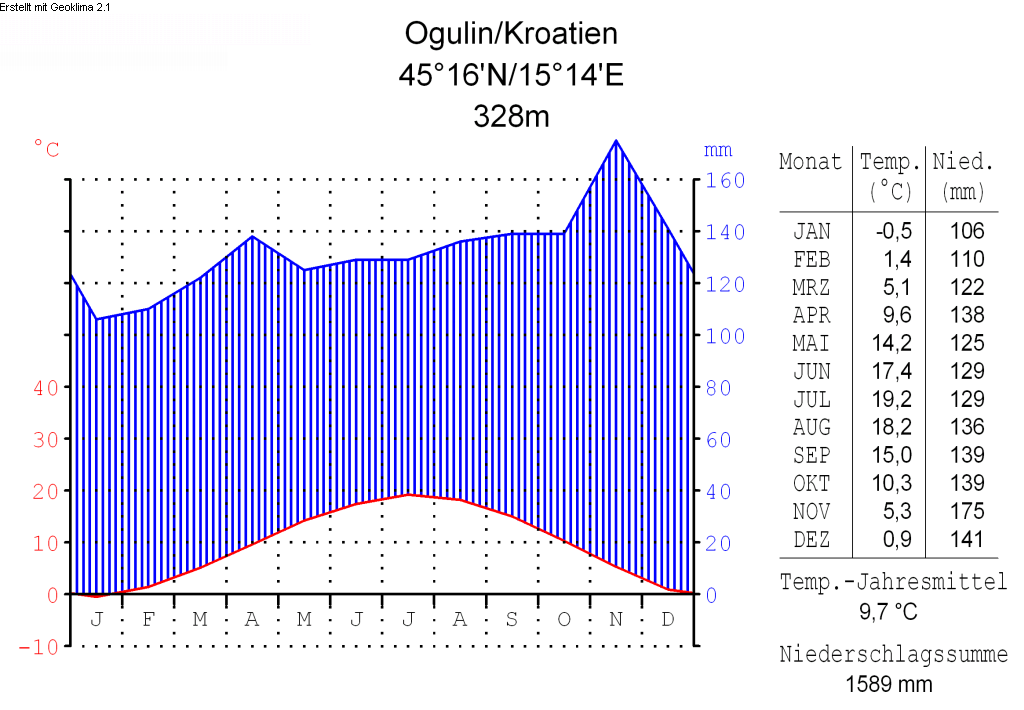
Climograph of the city of Ogulin north of the lakes

On average, the annual precipitation rate at the Plitvice Lakes is 1,500 mm (59 in). Usually, in spring and fall (autumn) the largest rain quantities are measured. The average relative air humidity is 81.8 percent. In January, the average temperature is 2.2 °C (36 °F). During the summer months of July and August, the temperature rises to 17.4 °C (63 °F). The general average annual temperature is 7.9 °C (46 °F). Snow falls from November until March. Usually, the lakes are frozen during December and January.

== The dissolution and creation of rock ==
The lakes of Plitvice are a result of century-old processes and the sedimentation of chalk, which is abundantly available in the waters of this karst area. These sedimentations are called tufa or travertine (both are called sedra or tuf in Croatian, apart from many other names like bigar or vapneni mačak).

=== Alteration processes ===
In geological terms, the actual phenomena molding the Plitvice Lakes are quite young. The complex processes of dissolution and sedimentation of limestone require specific climatic preconditions. These have only existed since the end of the ice age about 12,000 to 15,000 years ago, according to tufa radiocarbon datings.

Apart from weather and temperature factors, the water quality and other natural factors are significant for the creation of these natural phenomena, prevailing at the Plitvice Lakes. By passing through the limestone underground the karst rivers dissolve chalk (calcite), which concentrates in the water. The saturation level of calcite within the frontal flows is thus very high. The water becomes significantly mineralized, super-saturated with calcium and magnesium-hydrogencarbonate.

The quantity of calcium hydrogencarbonate (calcium bicarbonate) dissolved in water depends on the quantity of dissolved carbon dioxide in the water. Generally, the following could be said: The colder the water, the higher the quantity of dissolved calcium hydrogencarbonate. Depending on the conditions for the alteration processes, scientists identified limestone dissolution rates of 0.01 to 4 millimeters a year (it is possible that by the effect of rainwater about 1 m^{3} of limestone is dissolved in about 10,000 years).

==== Preconditions for sedimentation ====
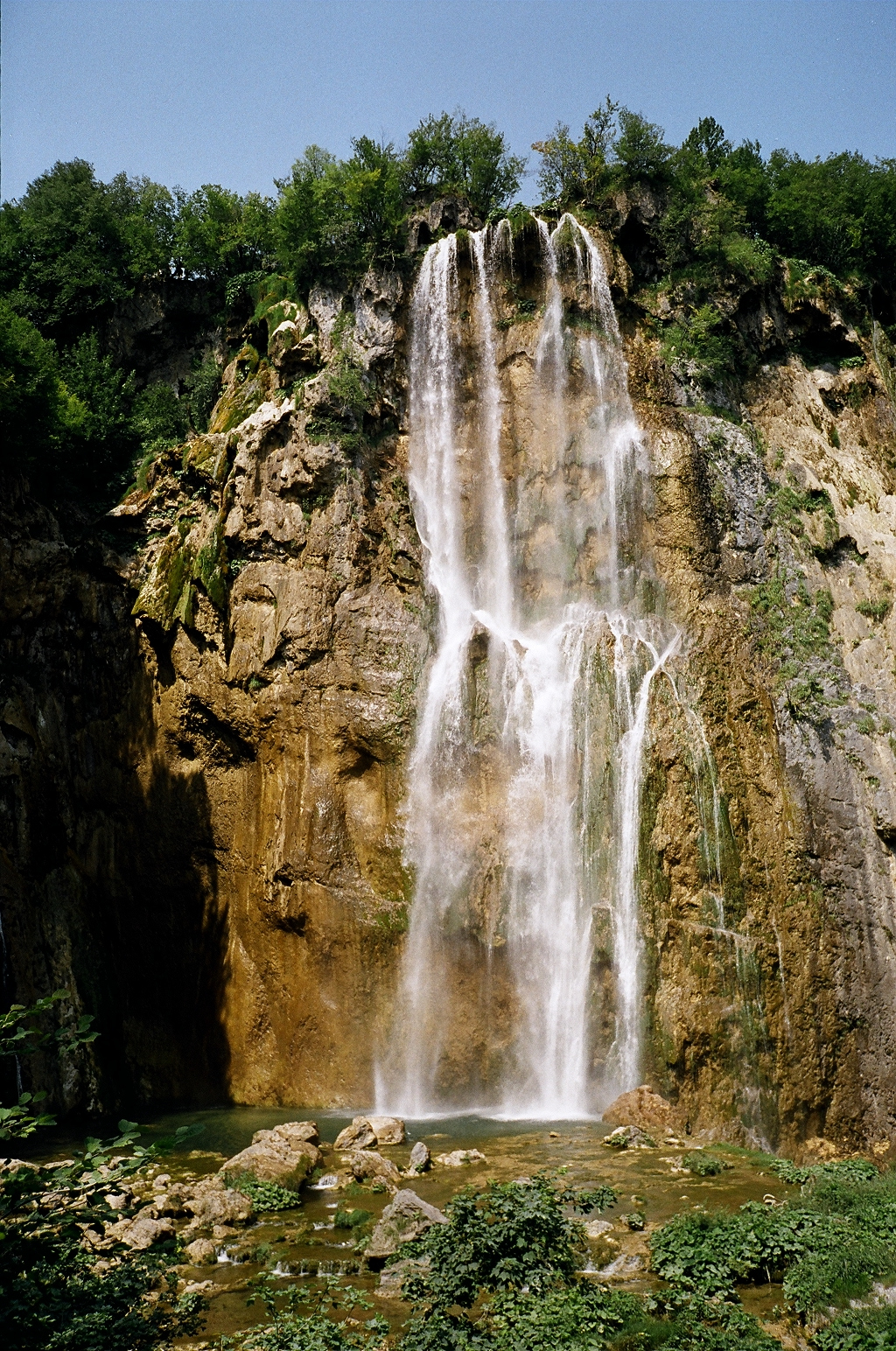
The large waterfall (78 m) of the Plitvica river at the Lower Lakes

Measurements of carbon dioxide quantities in the water show that they correspond with continuous sedimentation processes in the Plitvice Lakes area. Carbon dioxide quantities at the springs are about twenty times higher than in the atmosphere. The quantity of carbon dioxide decreases along the water route. The Plitvica river, for example, loses even up to 97% of its original quantity of carbon dioxide along its route.

The area of a river, in which the formation of tufa occurs, is called precipitation area. Along the Korana river, for example, measured from its origins, tufa is being formed only along the first 10 to 15 km (9.3 mi), even if according to pH measurements the conditions would be favorable further down the river. At the ground of Lake Kozjak a constant yearly sedimentation of 0,8 millimeters during the past 3,000 years has been ascertained. Yearly, the barriers are growing up to 13 millimeters in height. Tufa formation processes thus surpass erosion activities, which would destroy the sensitive barriers of the lakes. It is estimated that the tufa sedimentations at the ground of the lakes date back 6,000 or even 7,000 years.

The precipitation of calcium carbonate, however, does not occur right at the springs of the rivers that flow into the Plitvice Lakes. For the precipitation of carbonate chalk (calcium carbonate) the water needs to reach a certain mineral saturation level. At the springs this saturation level is about 1. For the precipitation, the water saturation level needs to be higher than 3. At the same time, the pH value of the water needs to be above 8,0 (slightly alkaline).

==== Thresholds become barriers ====
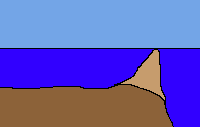
Cross-section of a barrier

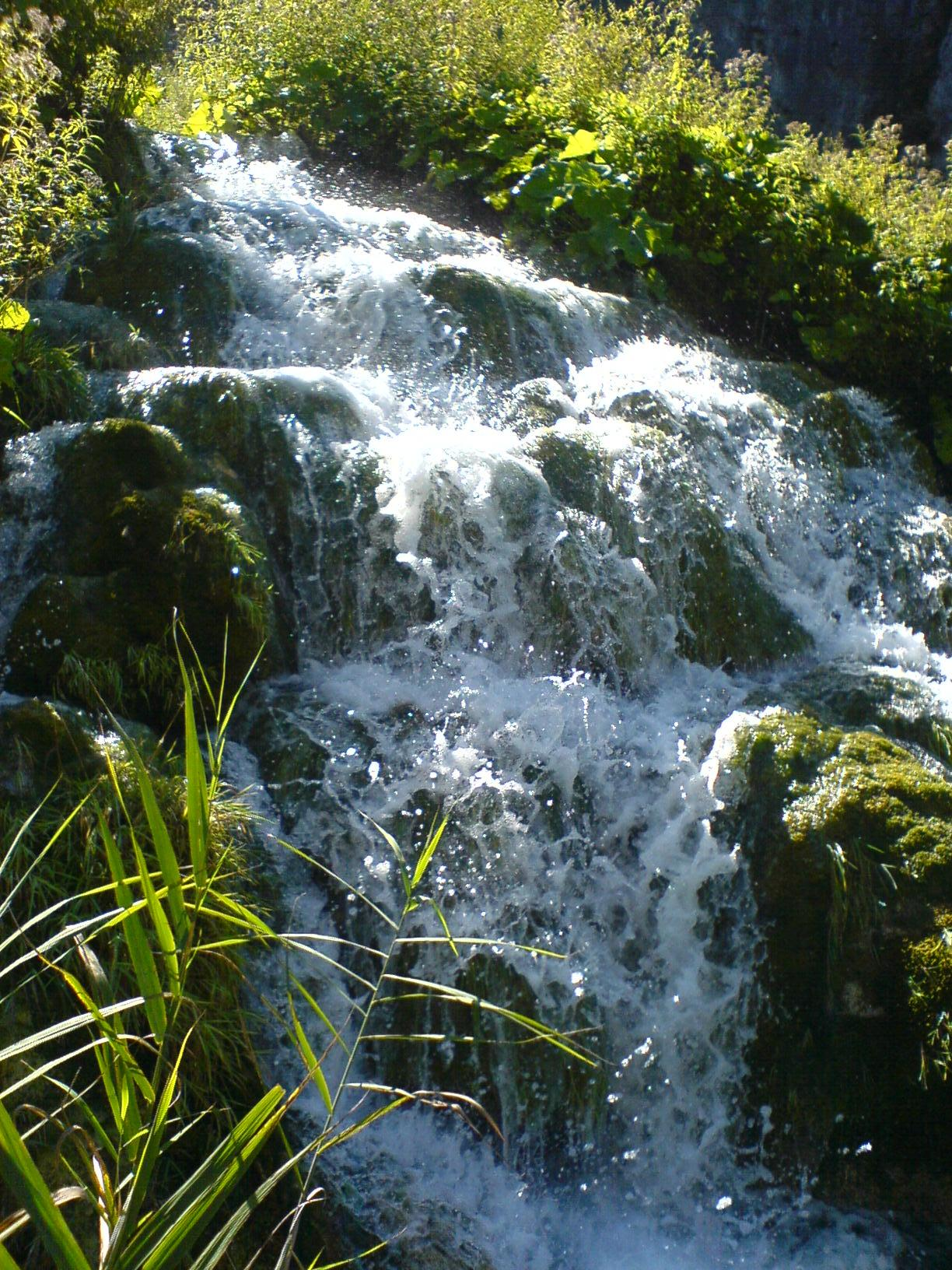
Small cascades

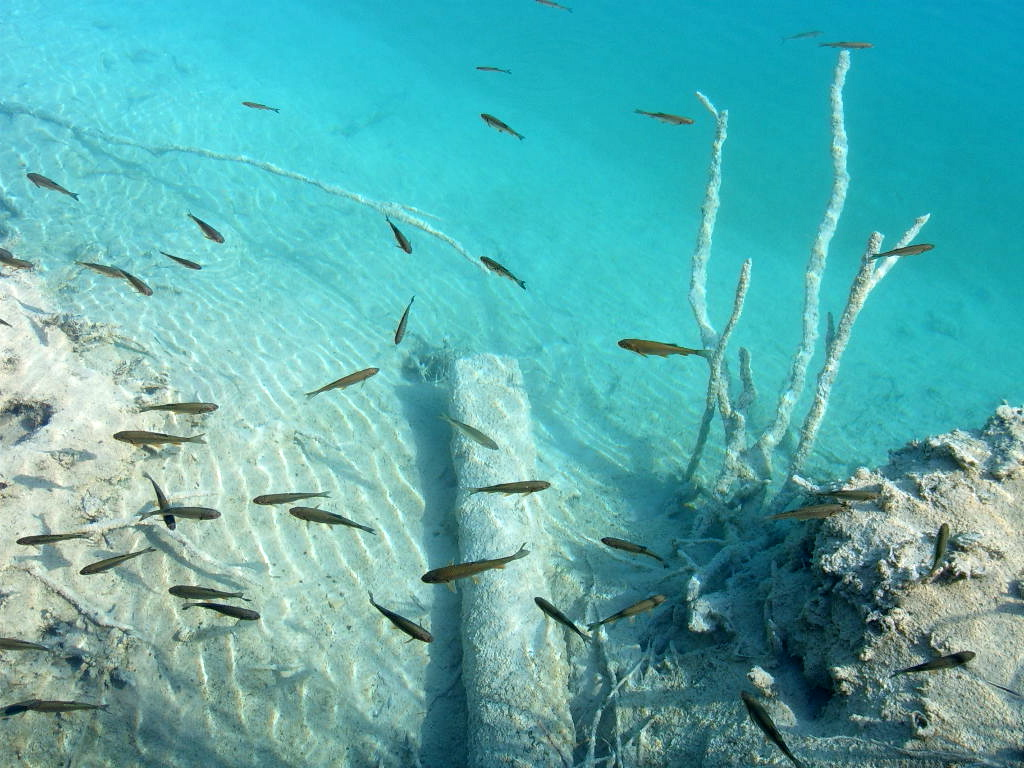
Fish in the crystal-clear water; European chub are driving away trout.

In the course of time, older barriers can be flooded by rising water levels since other barriers have outgrown the older ones. 400 years ago, there were two lakes in place of today's Kozjak lake. In the lowest third of the lake, at the level of Matijaševića draga, a crown of an underwater barrier that is 40 m high, is stretching 4 m below the water surface. This barrier certainly formed a magnificent waterfall in the past. The travertine barrier at the Kozjak bridges at the current end of the Kozjak lake, however, grew faster. Thus, 400 years ago two lakes merged in one. That is why the greatest depths of Kozjak lake are in its lower basin (north from the little island).

==== Influence of vegetation ====
Mosses, algae and water plants play a major role in forming the unique landscape of the Plitvice Lakes and its tufa barriers. Up until the 21st century, it was supposed by scientists, including the botanist Ivo Pevalek who initially argued for conservation efforts at Plitvice in 1926, that plants extract carbon dioxide from the water for photosynthesis purposes and that in return oxygen is released, thus resulting in the sedimentation of hydrogen carbonate phytogenesis.

Recent scientific evidence indicates that vegetation is not primarily responsible for the extraction of carbonate from the flowing water. However, plants indirectly contribute to tufa formation. For sedimentation to occur it is essential that the water be decelerated, aerated and sprayed. The mosses of the Plitvice Lakes waterfalls provide a substrate for sedimentation, generating travertine (tufa). Depending on the species found locally, various biological types of travertine can be differentiated. Photosynthesis by algae and mosses, however, fosters the crystallization of sediments because of the extraction of carbon dioxide. The young shoots of mosses are green and soft. They are mostly without travertine, while older shoots are encrusted by a thin and fragile yellow layer, completely covered and petrified by plant-formed travertine. The mosses foster not only the creation of tufa barriers, but also become part of the barrier. The moss becomes encrusted with travertine and fresh moss grows further out. First a crag is formed but later a cave roof forms under the crag. If the water continues flowing, the cave becomes progressively bigger. Older travertine is filled with fossilized algae and mosses. This type of tufa rock typical of the Plitvice Lakes is called "phytogeneous tufa."

==== Factors impeding tufa formation ====
During the 20th century, uncontrolled tourism and water pollution caused by waste water from hotels and agricultural activities in the surrounding area have led to damage. This has led to increasing eutrophication of the lakes (increased concentrations of organic substances within the water). For the sustainable formation of tufa it is therefore imperative to protect this extremely sensitive area from excessively harmful human influence. Since 2006, it has been strictly forbidden to bathe or swim in the lakes.

==== Types of rock ====
Cellular rock	Porous rock that has been exposed to external effects, for example rainwater (dolomite or limestone)
Tufa	Sedimentations of minerals from the water that typically consolidate on moss or on the underground of the lakes. These sediments are the results of century-old sedimentation processes. Year after year, new layers of sediments are being added.
Travertine	Consolidated tufa. Older, hardened sediments. This porous type of rock is very sensitive to physical impacts.

== Biodiversity ==
=== Flora ===
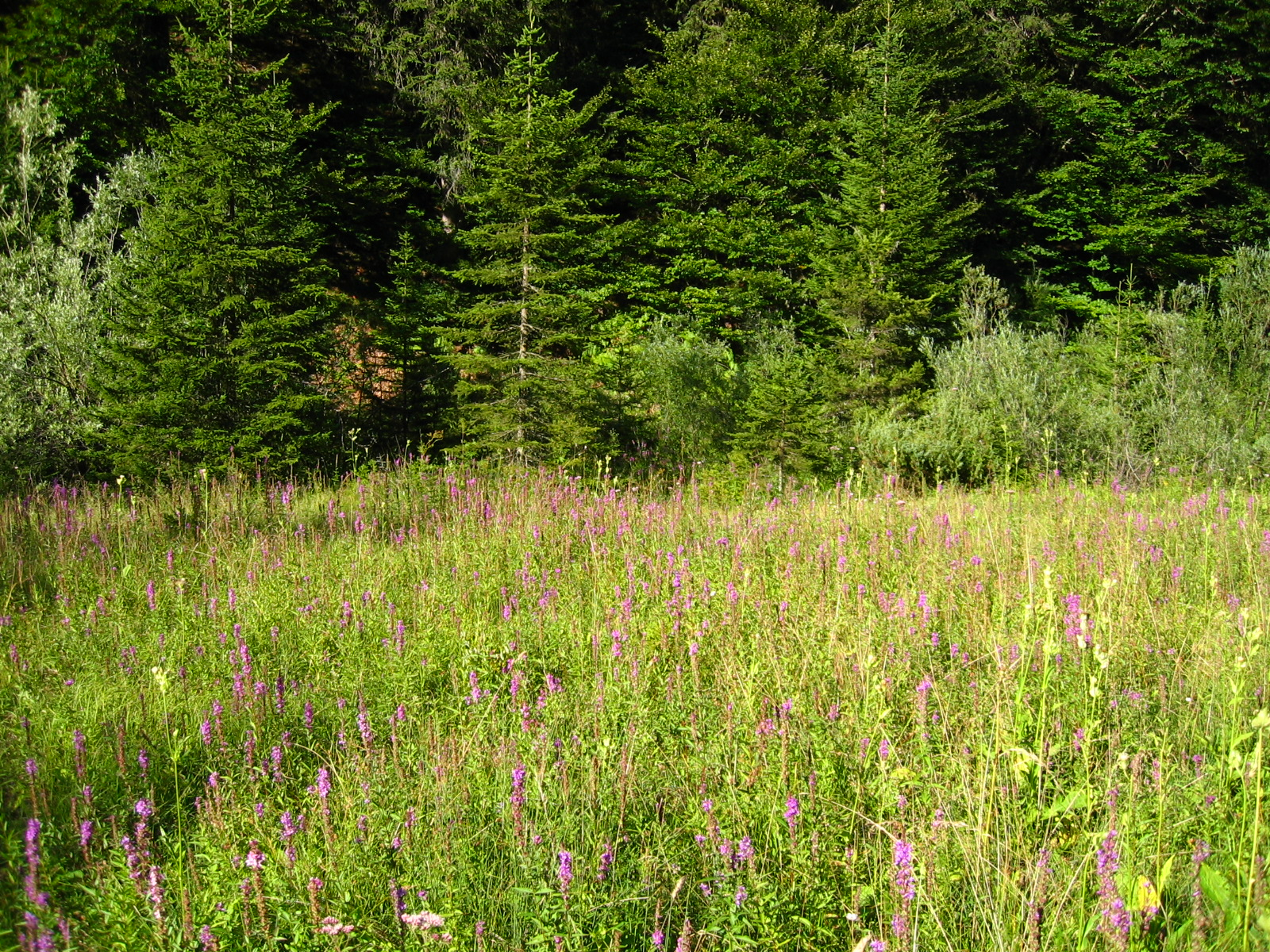
Bees, dragonflies and other insects gather in lush meadows.

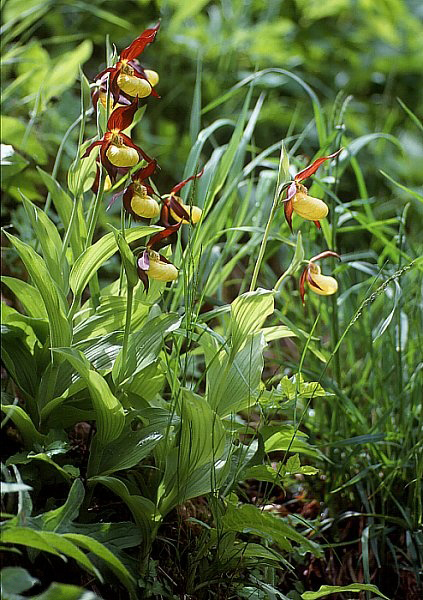
The lady's-slipper orchid Cypripedium calceolus

Scientists have so far identified 109 species in the area of the national park, of which 75 species are endemic. A great number of these plants and species are protected by law. Within the national park area 55 different species of orchids occur. The plant diversity creates an interesting interplay of colours that change with the seasons. The national park has an area of 29,842 hectares, of which some 22,308 hectares consists of forests (74.75 percent), 6,957 hectares are meadows (23.31 percent) (mainly in village areas), and 217 hectares (0.72 percent) are water areas. A unique area is the forest of Čorkova uvala, a 79.50 ha virgin forest in the northwestern part of the park. Some of the beech and fir trees in this area of the park are up to 700 years old.

=== Fauna ===
The area of the national park is home to the European brown bear, grey wolf, Eurasian eagle owl, Eurasian lynx, European wildcat, and western capercaillie occur.

The fauna of the Plitvice Lakes includes some 50 species of mammals. Scientists have so far discovered 321 different species of lepidoptera, of which 76 are day-flying butterflies, and 245 are nocturnal moths. However, they estimate that only about 40 percent of the lepidopteran population has been identified. Twelve amphibian and several reptile species have been recorded, including the viviparous lizard (Lacerta vivipara), the european green lizard (Lacerta viridis), the dice snake (Natrix tessellata), Vipera berus, Vipera ammodytes and the european pond turtle (Emys orbicularis).

Plitvice Lakes rank third among the Croatian national parks for avian diversity. Some 157 species have been counted, of which 70 have been recorded as breeding there. Recent findings list about 20 species of bat in the area, among them rare species in the genus Plecotus.

Brown trout (Salmo trutta fario and Salmo trutta lacustris) are indigenous subspecies of fish found in the lakes. S. t. fario is found mostly in the Upper Lakes, while S. t. lacustris is mainly found in Lake Kozjak. These species developed in different life conditions independently from each other within the various lakes.

== History ==
During the 6th century, Avars settled in this region, which were accompanied by the Croats. The Croats eventually defied Avar control and settled permanently in this region. In medieval times, frequent attacks by Mongols posed a permanent threat to the settled population. Croat rule and particularly the rule of the noble families Zrinski and Frankopan led to economic recovery in the wider area. On the remnants of an ancient settlement of the Japods and Romans a monastery was built at the lakes. Presumably, this monastery belonged to the Order of Saint Paul the First Hermit (Croatian pavlinci) or the Knights Templars. Today, only ancient wall remnants of this building (Croatian gradina) exist. The foundation was made of travertine rock. In addition to the native Croats already inhabiting the region and serving in the Austrian military, many central Europeans migrated to the region as did Serb Orthodox refugees fleeing Ottoman repression, who were given refuge in the abandoned areas in exchange for military service. The entire population of the military frontier, particularly the so-called frontiersmen, had the duty to protect this area of permanent unrest and terrible destruction. The region once also used to be called the garden of the devil (hortus diabolus).

=== Farmlands becoming an area of recreation ===
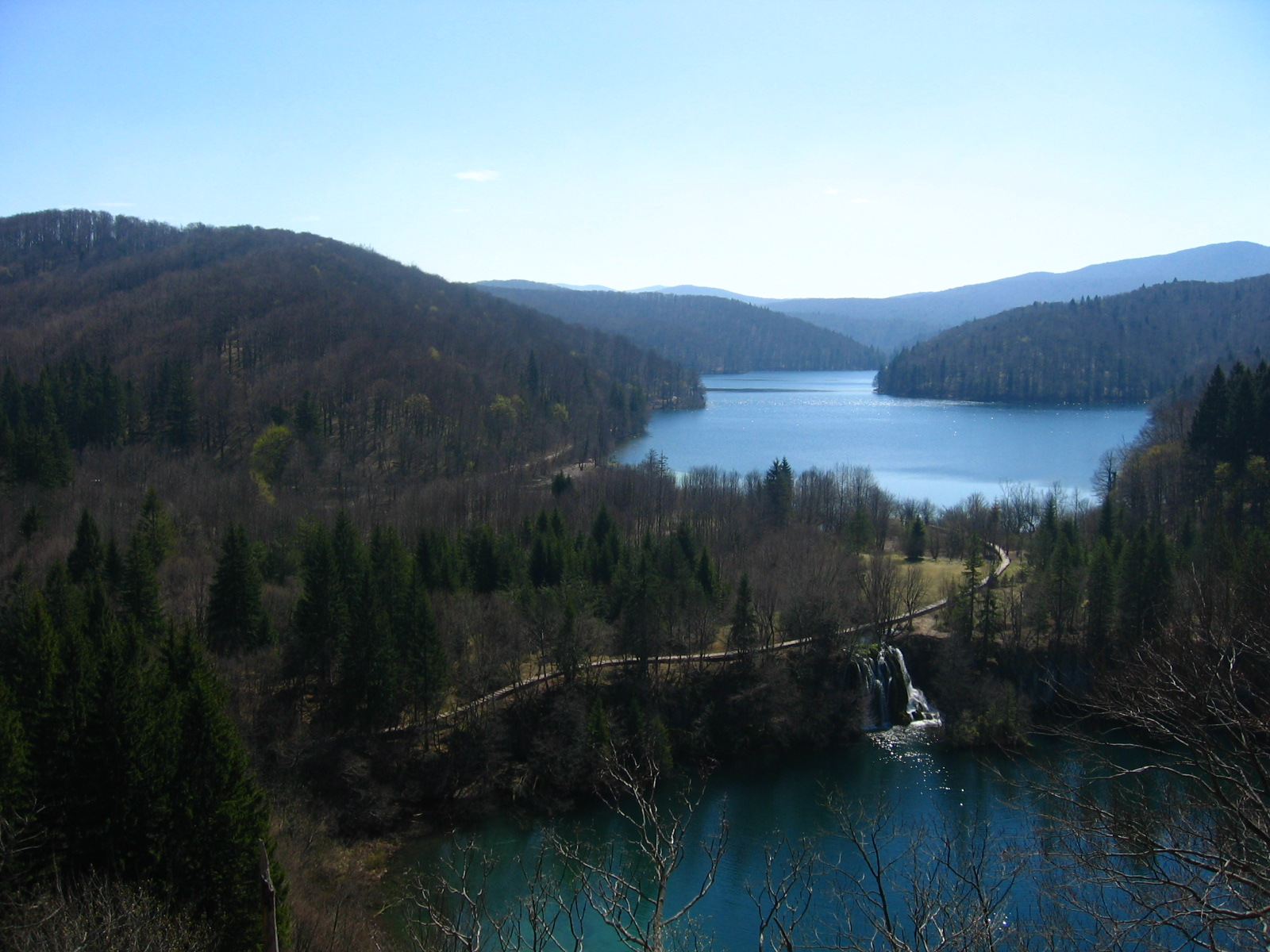
Prošćansko jezero

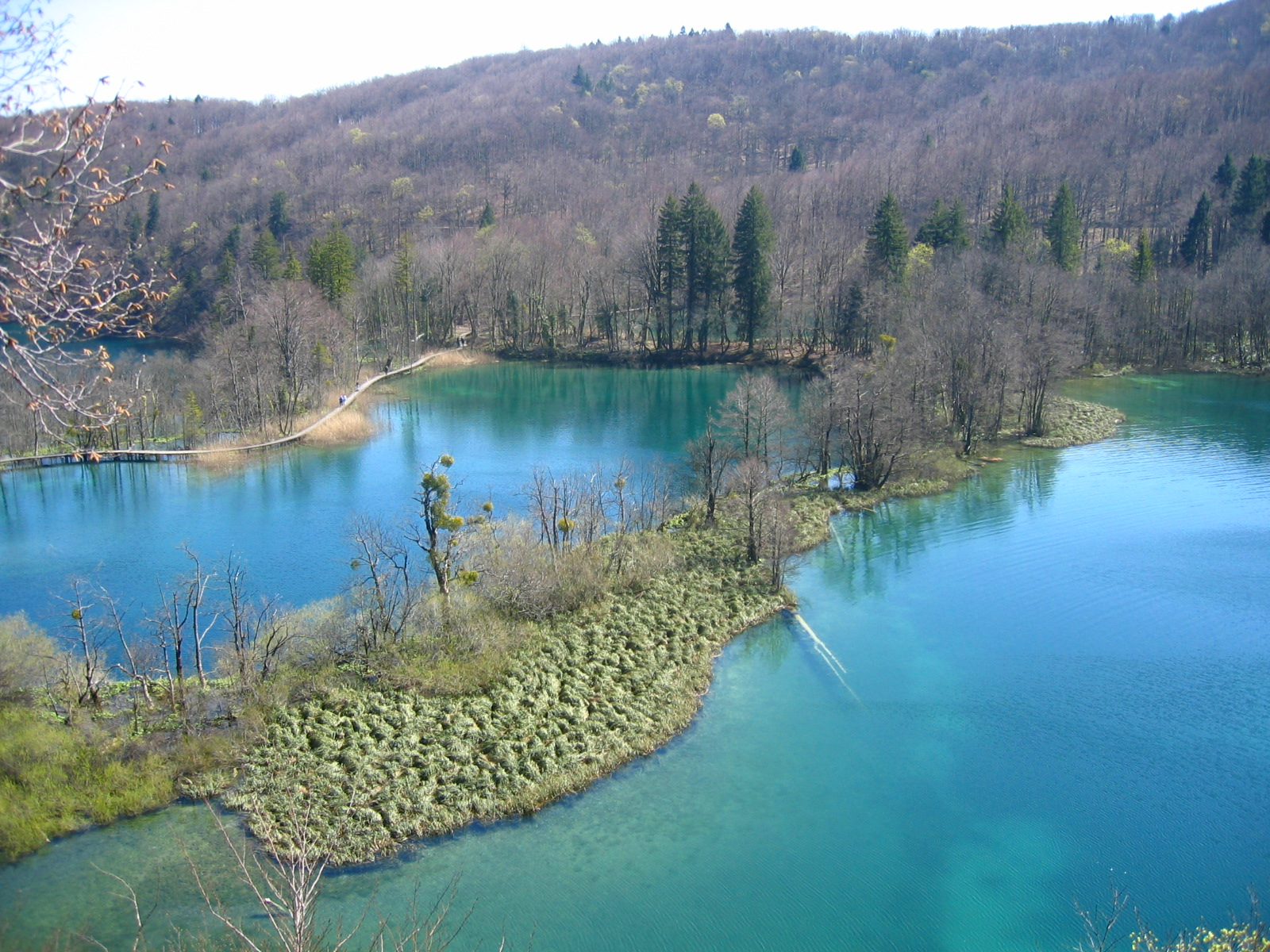
Okrugljak

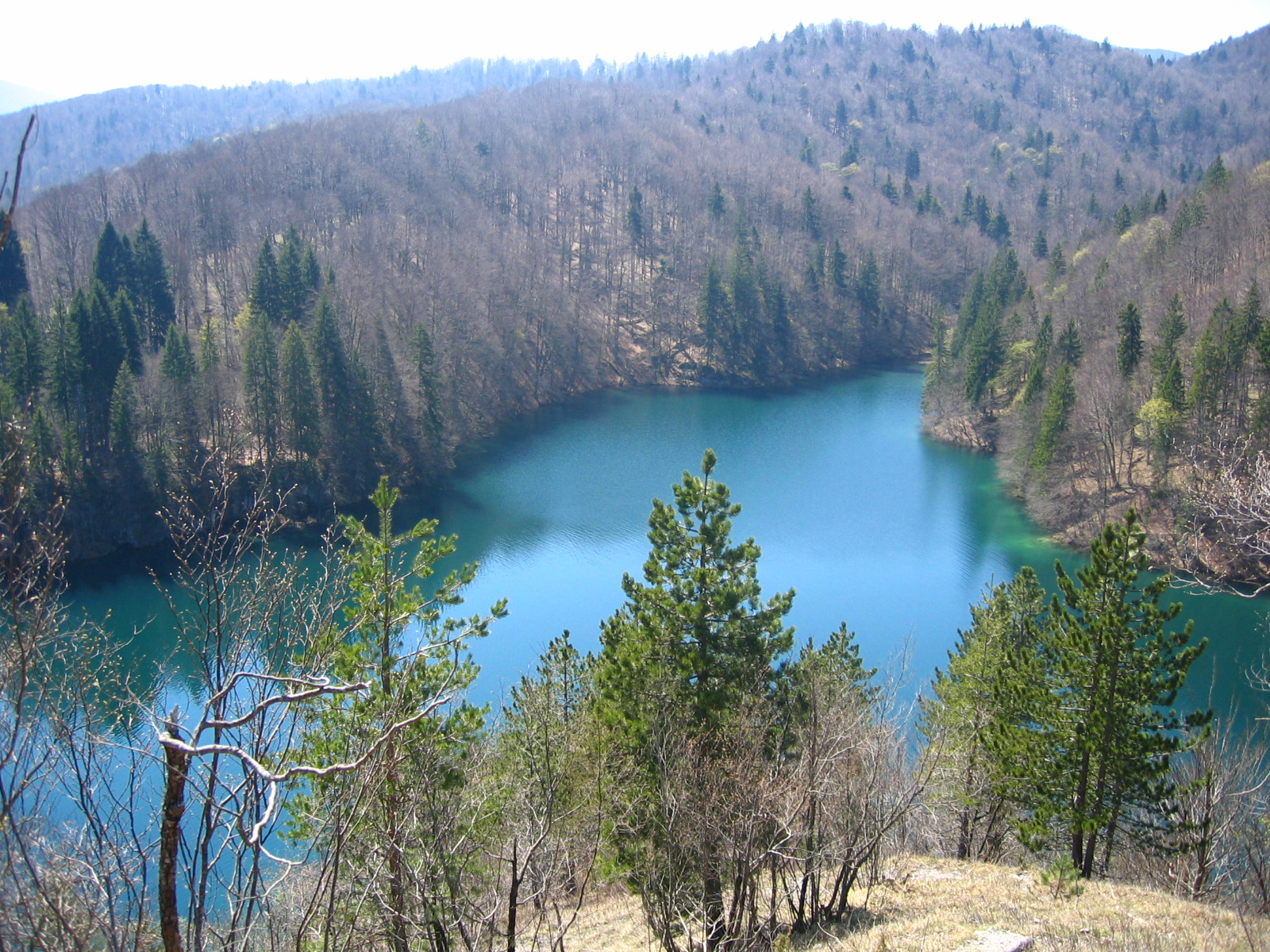
Gradinsko jezero

Already in 1861, an accommodation for travelers was erected at Velika Poljana. The local population called this accommodation the Emperor's house, since imperial military officers used to reside in this location. For the visit of Crown Princess Stéphanie of Belgium, the wife of Crown Prince Rudolf of Austria in 1888, the Plitvice Lakes and their surroundings were arranged for tourist purposes for the first time in history. Two paths still bear the names of the daughters of the Emperor Franz Joseph: "Stephanie's Path" (Croatian Štefanijin put) and "Dorothea's Path" (Croatian: Dorotejin put). At the same place, today called Labudovac, Gustav Janeček, a Czech from Zagreb, built a restaurant and accommodation. In 1893, Janeček founded the Society for the preservation of the Plitvice Lakes (Croatian Društvo za uređenje i poljepšanje Plitvičkih jezera), with the aim of preserving the lakes after all negative influence they have been exposed to. The society also built a hotel at the lakes. In 1898, one of the waterfalls was named after Croatian opera singer Milka Ternina. She gave money from concerts to preserve the park, upgrade tracks and build pathways. During the following decades, preservation efforts reached a deadlock. However, some very significant meetings took place at the Plitvice Lakes during the Second World War, as for example the first secret regional conference of the League of Communists of Croatia (Croatian: Savez komunista Hrvatske, SKH) in 1940. On June 14, 1943 one of the founding sessions of the National Anti-Fascist Council of the People's Liberation of Croatia (ZAVNOH) took place at Plitvice Lakes. This was the highest governing organ of the anti-fascist movement in Croatia during World War II. The former Secretary General of the Communist Party of Croatia, Rade Končar, was born in Končarev Kraj at the Plitvice Lakes in 1911.

=== The lakes as national park ===
Between 1962 and 1968, many Western film productions of Karl May novels were shot at the Plitvice Lakes (mainly German-French-Yugoslav coproductions). The most successful film of this series, Treasure of Silver Lake, was also produced at some locations within the national park. (Kaluđerovac in the lower lakes served as scenery for the Silver Lake.)

During the 1970s, detailed land registers of the national park were recorded. The park was inscribed on the UNESCO World Natural Heritage List in 1979 in recognition of its "outstanding natural beauty, and the undisturbed production of travertine (tufa) through chemical and biological action".

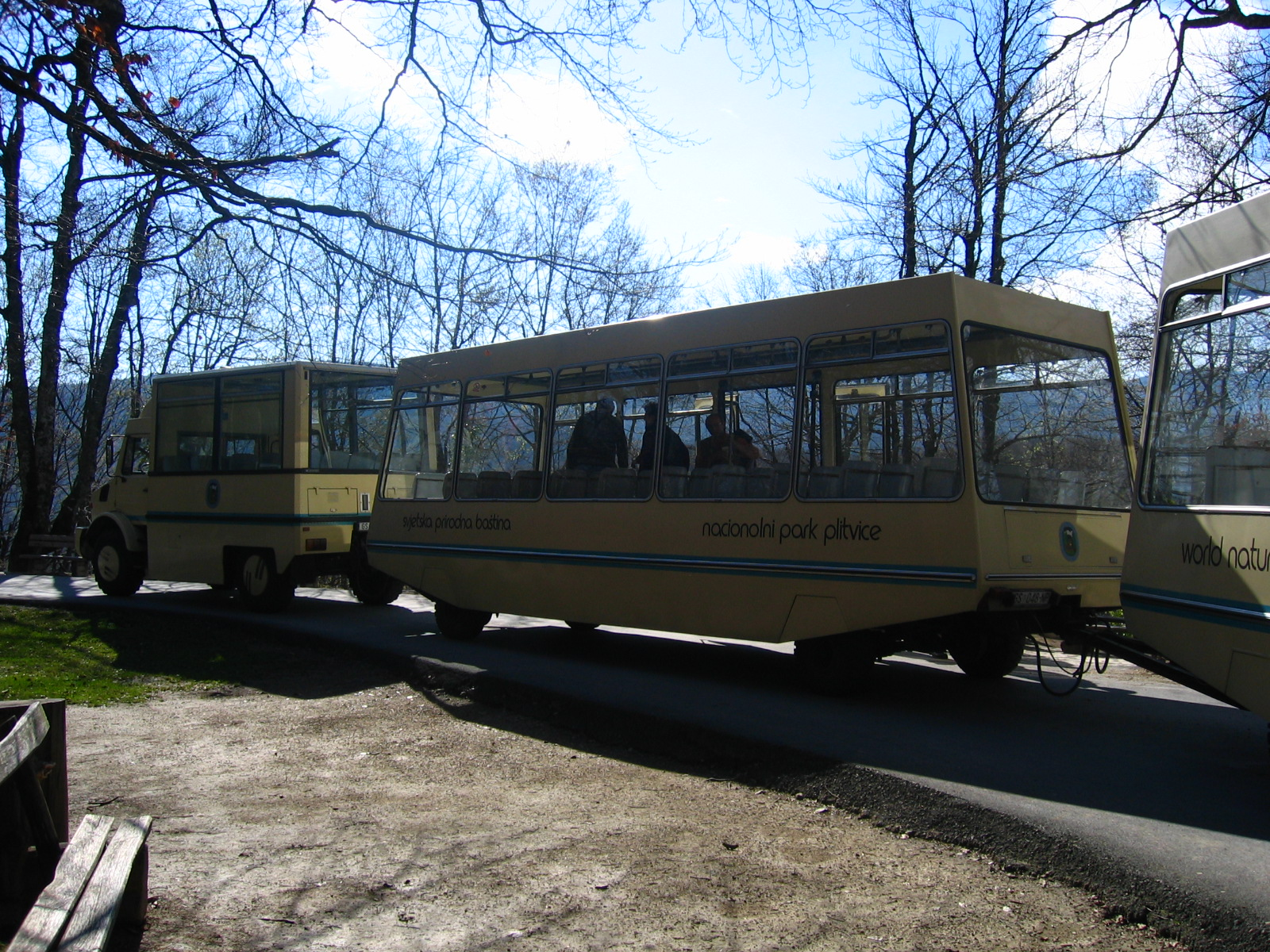
Bus connection offered to visitors of the national park

During the 1980s, tourism was booming in Yugoslavia. Plitvice Lakes National Park soon became one of Yugoslavia's most popular tourist attractions. The beginning of the 1990s, however, marked another great turning point in the history of this national park. In March 1991 it became the scene of the Plitvice Lakes incident (also called the "Plitvice Bloody Easter"), the first armed confrontation of the Croatian War of Independence that resulted in fatalities. The park was held by local Serb rebels backed by Slobodan Milošević and the Yugoslav People's Army (JNA) as part of the self-proclaimed Republic of Serbian Krajina during the conflict and suffered some damage in the process, with hotels and other facilities being used as barracks. During the period under the control of Serb forces loyal to Belgrade, Croats were ethnically cleansed from the region systematically.

Year	Number of visitors
1894	1,000
1989	500,000
1996	238,401
2000	482,275
2004	749,209
2008	948,891
2011	1,083,638
2014	1,184,449
2016	1,429,228
2024	1,492,994

Within the national park continuous scientific research projects are being carried out. The national park administration currently endeavors to introduce new, progressive protection measures. There is a proposal to replace the wooden bridges and paths by floating pontoon bridges. The existing wooden paths are anchored within the travertine sediments, creating the danger of seepage and cracks of the weak travertine.

The Plitvice Lakes are one of the most frequently visited tourist attractions in Croatia. Their natural, cultural and tourist significance has become a motor for the local economy. About 1,000,000 visitors per year greatly contribute to the economic development of the wider region.

Because of high tourism and illegal construction around the lakes, with faecal waste flowing down to surrounding woods and lakes without any treatment, the water in the lakes became polluted and no longer drinkable. In 2018, UNESCO threatened to remove the park's status as a World Natural Heritage site. In 2019, the park management introduced restrictions so that in the summer months it would receive up to 12,000 visitors a day, and 600 people per each park entrance and per hour.

In 2024, the Park director told the press the main restriction in their visit management plan is the number of daily visitors in the summer, and that beyond that the capacity is not exhausted. In practice, the yearly number of visitors hovers around 1.5 million, which is also almost 10% of all yearly visitors to Croatia. The same year, they recorded the largest amount of visitors in August, while May and September had more visitors than June, indicating a positive trend.

== Local customs and traditions ==
The preservation of old customs and traditions is of high significance for the local population. The local culture has also been detected as an important factor for tourism. As regards architecture, the region of Lika is well known for its low wooden houses with roofs made of rye straw or shingles. Many features of the ancient living style are mirrored in local costumes. They tell a lot about regional affiliations or social standings of those who have worn those costumes. Under French rule, men were allowed to wear their costumes during military service.

== Lake names and anecdotes ==
Each of the Plitvice Lakes has a story or legend to tell. Most lake names stem from true events.

Lake	Other names	Approximate translation	Explanation
Prošćansko jezero	Prošće	Scrub Lake or Crave Lake	The name comes from the fences that have been built by farmers as delimitation between the farmlands and the lakes. The farmers used stakes (Croatian prošće), poles, scrub and earth to build these fences. The Legend of the Black Queen, the legend on "prošnja" (praying the black Queen for water) says that the inhabitants of this region were craving for water and thus called upon the magic queen to help them, which she did. According to the legend, this is the reason why Prošćansko jezero and the other lakes have emerged.
Ciginovac	Cigino jezero Ciganovac jezero	Gypsy's Lake	According to a legend, a Roma (gypsy) drowned in this lake while fishing.
Okrugljak	Okruglić; Okrugljaj; Kruginovac	Round Lake	The name stems from its round shape.
Batinovac	Batin; Bakinovac	Lake Batin/Batić's Lake	People reported that a villager named Batinić used to dwell at this lake. Others say that a grandmother (Croatian baka) might have drowned in this lake.
Veliko jezero	Jovinovac veliki	Large Lake	
Malo jezero	Jovinovac mali Veliko jezerce	Small Lake	
Vir		Whirlpool	The name originates from water whirling downward in the middle of the lake.
Galovac		Galov's/Galović's Lake	Allegedly, a bandit chief named captain Gal, who defeated the Turks, was shot down at this lake. It could also have been named after a brig and Galović.
Milinovo jezero	Milino Jezerce	Mile's Lake	According to a legend, a man named Mile Mirić from Mirić Stropina drowned in this lake.
Gradinsko jezero	Jezerce; Jezerac	Lake Gradina	The lake is named after a building (Croatian gradina) or monastery which had once been situated on the peak between Kozjak lake and this one.
Burgeti	Burgeti; Bugeti	Gush Lakes	A chain of small shallow lakes separated by travertine barriers, and covered by low vegetation. The name comes from agitated waterflow in small scars which make noise or "boil".
Kozjak	Kozje Jezero	Goat Lake	On the island in the middle of the lake (today Štefanijin otok, Stephanie's Lake) farmers used to protect their goats from wolves. The name originates from a legend, according to which 30 young goats were running away from wolves during winter. They drowned in the lake as the thin ice layer cracked.
Milanovac	Milanovo Jezero	Milan's Lake	According to a legend, the lake was named after a shepherd called Mile who drowned in it, or after the miller Mile Perišić who owned a mill at the lake.
Gavanovac	Gavanovo Jezero; Osredak Jezero; Okrugljak Donji	Gavan's Lake	Allegedly, the treasure of a man named Gavan (the Gavanovo treasure) lies hidden in this lake.
Kaluđerovac	Kaluđerovo Jezero	Monk Lake or Hermit Lake	According to reports, a monk or hermit (Croatian kaluđer) used to live either in Šupljara Cave just next to the water or in Golubnjača Cave at the canyon edge. People used to seek advice from this monk.
Novakovića brod		Novaković's crossing	According to a tale, a hajduk named Novaković was thrown off his horse into this lake. Other reports say that a man named Novaković used to offer boat rides across this lake.

== Waterfalls ==
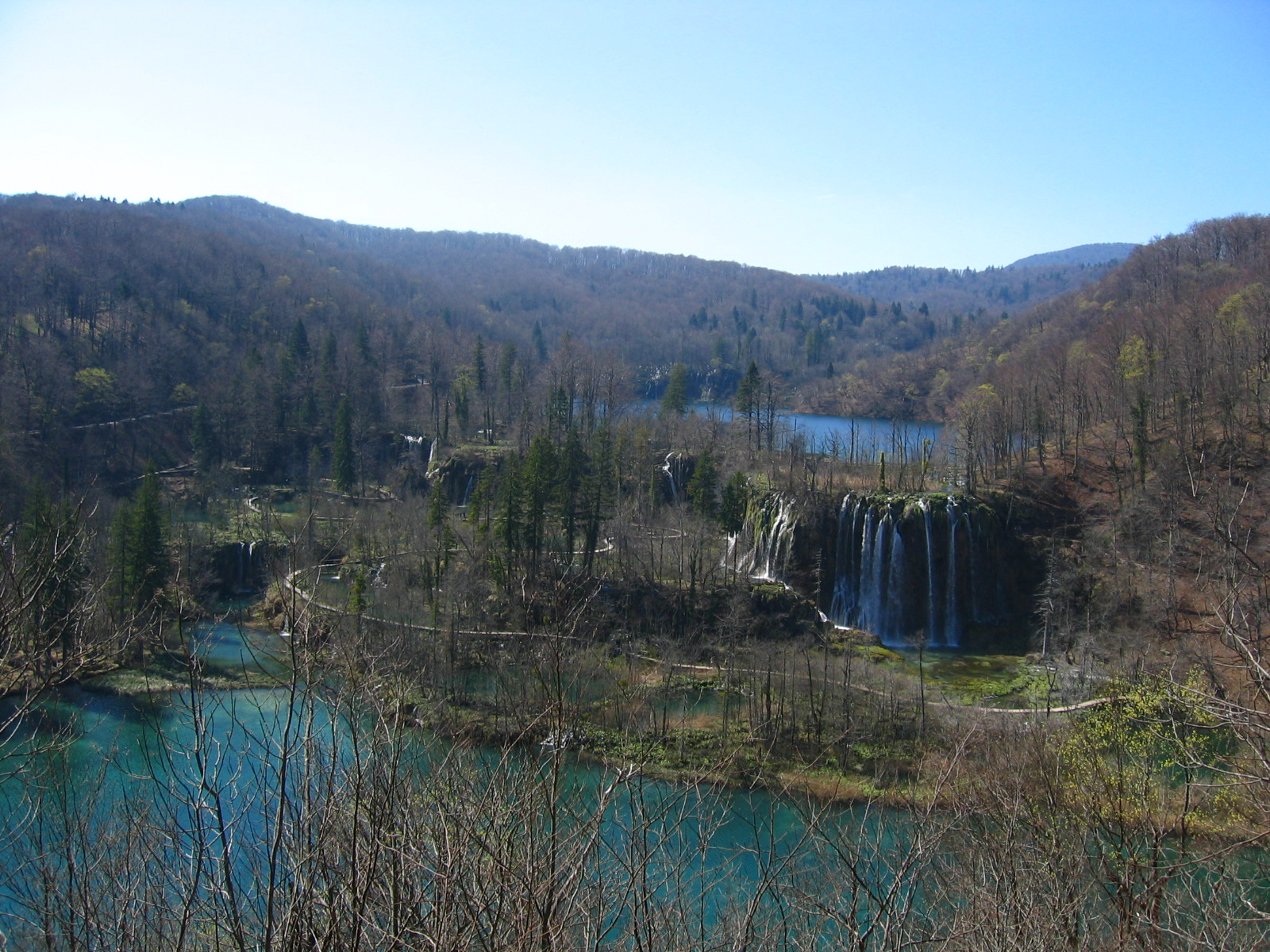
Galovac waterfall

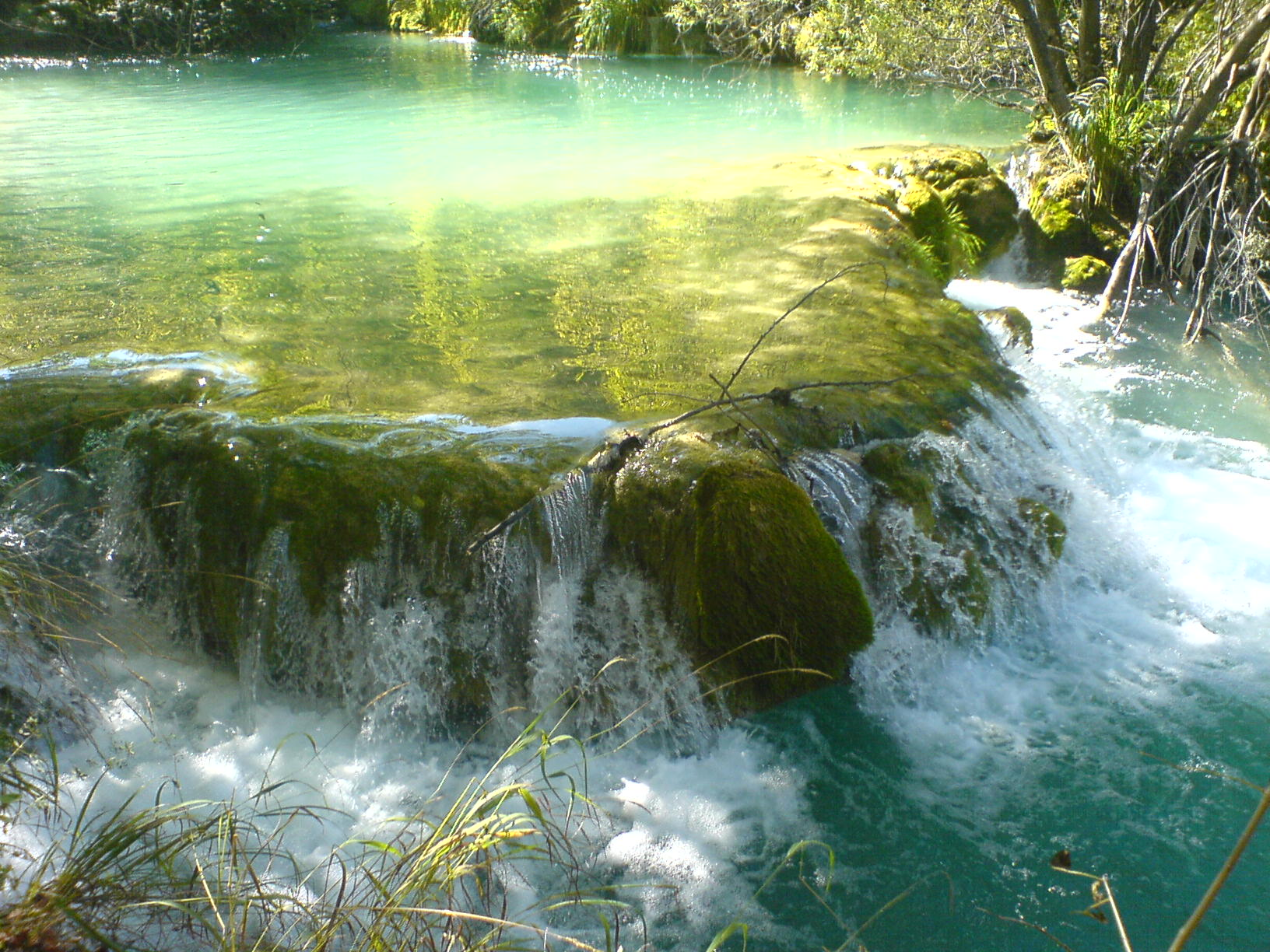
The cascades of Milka Trnina

A number of waterfalls in the Plitvice area have been named:

- Jarkuše, between the Ciginovac and Okrugljak lakes
- Labudovački slap, between Prošćansko jezero and Ciginovac
- Labudovac, between Labudovac and Batinovac
- Mali Prštavac, Veliki Prštavac, Stari and Veliki Galovački buk (20 m/66 ft), all between Galovac and Milino and Gradinsko jezero
- Milka Trnina Waterfall, between Milanovac and Gavanovac
- Sastavci, between Novakovića Brod and rivers Plitvica/Korana
- Plitvica or Veliki slap, lit. 'Big Waterfall', (78 m/256 ft), on the Plitvica stream
- Four Korana waterfalls, on the river downstream

== See also ==
- List of waterfalls
- List of protected areas of Croatia
- List of World Heritage Sites in Croatia

== Bibliography ==
- Mato Njavro (ed.): Plitvice Lakes, Turistička naklada d.o.o., Zagreb 2005, ISBN 953-215-212-1
- Josip Movčan, Drago Zdunić: Plitvice, Grafički zavod Hrvatske, Spektar, Zagreb 1985 (German, Croatian, English, French)
- Dragutin Franić: Plitvička jezera i njihova okolica, Tisak kraljevske zemaljske tiskare, Zagreb 1910 (Croatian)
- Branimir Gušić, Mirko Marković (ed.): Plitvička jezera – čovjek i priroda, Grafički zavod Hrvatske, Zagreb 1974 (Croatian)
- Jeanne Oliver, Lonely Planet Croatia, pp. 164–166 (Lonely Planet, 2005)
- Radovan Radovinović (ed.), The Croatian Adriatic (Naklada Naprijed, Zagreb)
- Uredništvo (1986). "Uklanjanje fosfata iz voda pomoću troske" [Removing Phosphates from Water Bodies with the Aid of Slag]. Priroda: popularni časopis hrvatskog prirodoslovnog društva. Vol. 74, no. 9–10. p. 242. ISSN 0351-0662.
- Šikić, Zoran, ed. (October 2007). Plan upravljanja Nacionalnog parka Plitvička Jezera [Plitvice Lakes National Park Management Plan] (PDF) (in Croatian). Croatian Ministry of Culture. ISBN 978-953-6240-83-8. Archived from the original (PDF) on 1 July 2014.
