= Plitvička Jezera =

- Municipality
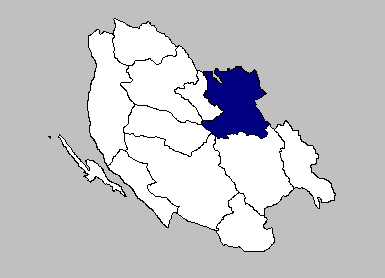
- Plitvička Jezera municipality within Lika-Senj County
- Interactive map of Plitvička Jezera
- Location of Plitvička Jezera within Croatia
- Coordinates: 44°52′N 15°37′E
- Country: Croatia
- County: Lika-Senj County

Government
  - Mayor: Ante Kovač (Independent)

Area
  - Municipality: 469.0 km^{2} (181.1 sq mi)
  - Urban: 7.2 km^{2} (2.8 sq mi)
- Elevation: 612 m (2,008 ft)

Population (2021)
  - Municipality: 3,649
  - Density: 7.780/km^{2} (20.15/sq mi)
  - Urban: 301
  - Urban density: 42/km^{2} (110/sq mi)
- Time zone: UTC+1 (CET)
  - Summer (DST): UTC+2 (CEST)
- Postal code: 53230 Korenica
- Area code: +385 (0)53
- Website: plitvicka-jezera.hr

Plitvička Jezera (pronounced [plîtv̞itʃkaː jɛzɛ̌ra] or just Plitvice [plîtv̞itsɛ]; Plitvice Lakes, in English) is settlement and a municipality in central Croatia, in the eastern part of the Lika-Senj county. It lies in and near the eponymous Plitvice Lakes National Park, bisected by the D1 main road (Zagreb–Split). Its total area is 469.08 km^{2} The main town and seat of the municipality is Korenica. Smaller towns and villages are Bjelopolje, Jezerce, and Ličko Petrovo Selo.

== Demographics ==
According to the 2001 census, its total population was 4,668. The ethnic composition of Plitvička Jezera was 67.3% Croat and 30.5% Serb. In the 2011 census, the population dropped to 4,373, of which 70.11% were Croats and 27.08% were Serbs.

In 2021, the municipality had 3,649 residents in the following 41 settlements:

- Bjelopolje, population 71
- Čanak, population 30
- Čujića Krčevina, population 6
- Donji Vaganac, population 37
- Drakulić Rijeka, population 6
- Gornji Vaganac, population 86
- Gradina Korenička, population 67
- Homoljac, population 10
- Jasikovac, population 24
- Jezerce, population 230
- Kalebovac, population 37
- Kapela Korenička, population 7
- Kompolje Koreničko, population 104
- Končarev Kraj, population 1
- Korana, population 44
- Korenica, population 1563
- Kozjan, population 0
- Krbavica, population 29
- Ličko Petrovo Selo, population 54
- Mihaljevac, population 22
- Novo Selo Koreničko, population 17
- Oravac, population 22
- Plitvica Selo, population 48
- Plitvička Jezera, population 301
- Plitvički Ljeskovac, population 15
- Poljanak, population 81
- Ponor Korenički, population 1
- Prijeboj, population 5
- Rastovača, population 78
- Rešetar, population 32
- Rudanovac, population 95
- Sertić Poljana, population 3
- Smoljanac, population 229
- Šeganovac, population 7
- Trnavac, population 4
- Tuk Bjelopoljski, population 17
- Vranovača, population 132
- Vrelo Koreničko, population 102
- Vrpile, population 8
- Zaklopača, population 2
- Željava, population 22
Plitvička Jezera: Population trends 1857–2021
v

population	14425	16789	15435	15964	17436	16457	16072	15097	9292	9198	8898	8086	7383	7156	4668	4373	3649
	1857	1869	1880	1890	1900	1910	1921	1931	1948	1953	1961	1971	1981	1991	2001	2011	2021

Sources: Croatian Bureau of Statistics publications

== Climate ==
Since records began in 1986, the highest temperature recorded at the Plitvice weather station was 38.6 °C (101.5 °F), on 4 August 2017. The coldest temperature was −22.6 °C (−8.7 °F), on 13 January 2003.

== Politics ==
=== Minority councils and representatives ===
Directly elected minority councils and representatives are tasked with consulting tasks for the local or regional authorities in which they are advocating for minority rights and interests, integration into public life and participation in the management of local affairs. At the 2023 Croatian national minorities councils and representatives elections Serbs of Croatia fulfilled legal requirements to elect 10 members minority council of the Municipality of Plitvička Jezera.

== History ==
When the German and Italian Zones of Influence were revised on 24 June 1942, Plitvice fell in Zone II, administered civilly by Croatia but militarily by Italy.

During the Croatian War of Independence and the Krajina uprising, many areas were mined to stop enemy advances. The area around the Korana Bridge has recently been de-mined, but there are still other areas suspected to be mine contaminated as per reports from the local NGO Croatian Mine Action Centre.

Many local ethnic Serbs left the municipality during the war. Between 1,500 and 2,000 have returned. According to Human Rights Watch, many of the ethnic Serbian returnees were experiencing higher unemployment rates and being "excluded from work in municipal or town-run services and institutions, including the National Park".

== Economy ==
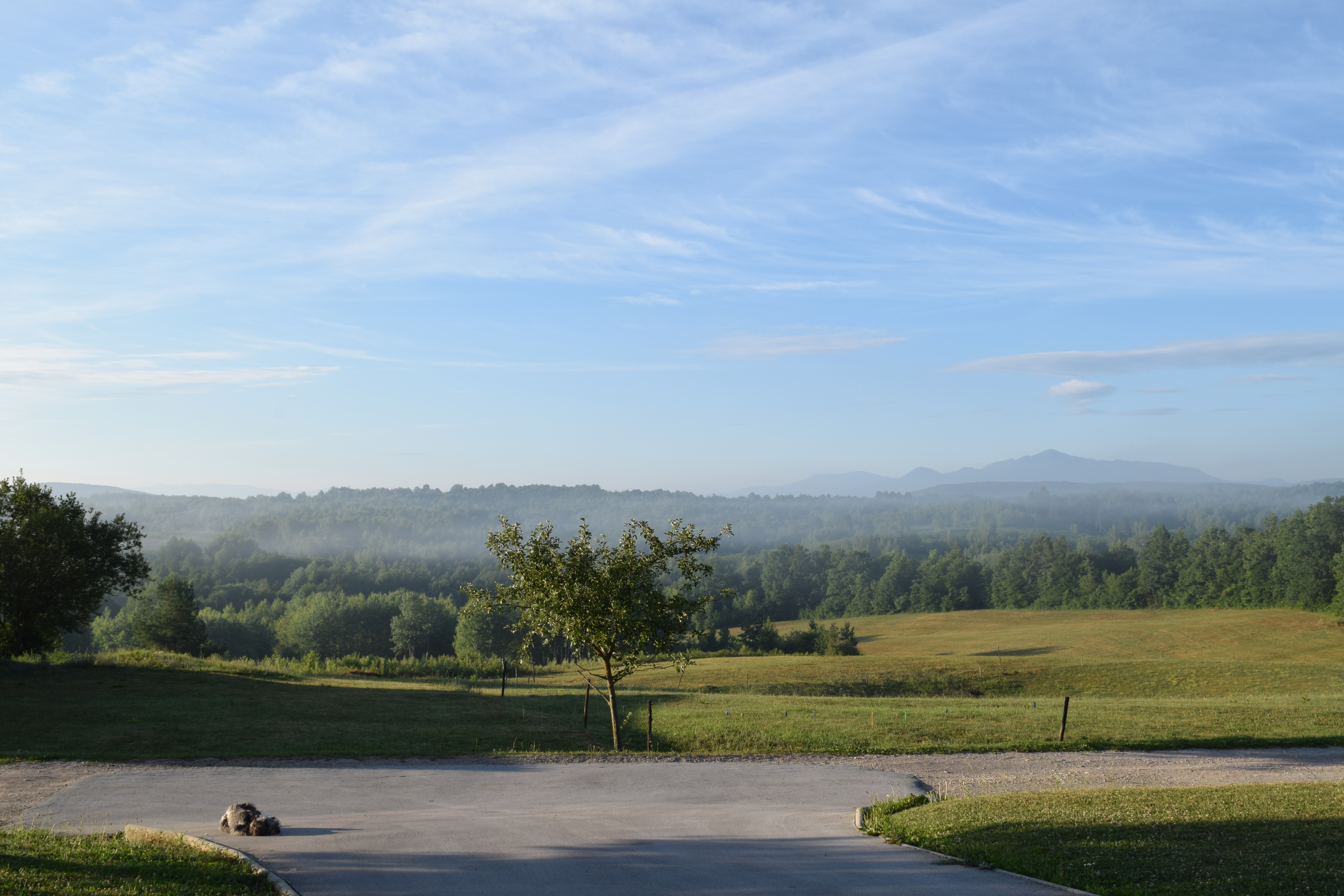
View from a lodging in Rakovica

Plitvice Lakes National Park is a major tourist destination and the area's main source of income, together with arable lands, grazing lands and woods. Due to the Plitvice Lakes National Park's unique geological evolution and beauty, it was entered in the UNESCO world heritage list in 1979. Plitvička Jezera is an underdeveloped municipality which is statistically classified as the First Category Area of Special State Concern by the Government of Croatia.

== See also ==
- Plitvice Lakes National Park
- Plitvice Lakes incident
- List of archaeological heritage sites in Plitvička Jezera

== Notable natives and residents ==
- Rade Končar (1911–1942) - antifascist, communist and People's Hero of Yugoslavia
- Bogdan Dragović

== Bibliography ==
=== Biology ===
- Šašić, Martina; Nahirnić, Ana; Tarmann, Gerhard M. (2016-12-31). "Zygaenidae (Lepidoptera) in the Lepidoptera collections of the Croatian Natural History Museum". Natura Croatica: Periodicum Musei Historiae Naturalis Croatici. 25 (2): 233–248. doi:10.20302/NC.2016.25.19. eISSN 1848-7386.

=== History ===
- Trgo, Fabijan, ed. (1964). Zbornik dokumenata i podataka o Narodno-oslobodilačkom ratu Jugoslovenskih naroda. Vol. V, 32.
