= Jasikovac, Croatia =

Jasikovac
- Village
- Interactive map of Jasikovac
- Location within Croatia
- Coordinates: 44.725°N 15.721°E
- Country: Croatia
- County: Lika-Senj
- Municipality: Plitvička Jezera

Area
  - Total: 1.06 sq mi (2.74 km^{2})

Population (2021)
  - Total: 24
  - Density: 23/sq mi (8.8/km^{2})
- Time zone: UTC+1 (CET)
  - Summer (DST): UTC+2 (CEST)

Jasikovac is a village in Plitvička Jezera, Croatia. It is connected by the D1 road.
