= Battle of Otočac (1543) =

Battle in 1543

- Part of Hundred Years' Croatian–Ottoman War and Ottoman–Habsburg wars
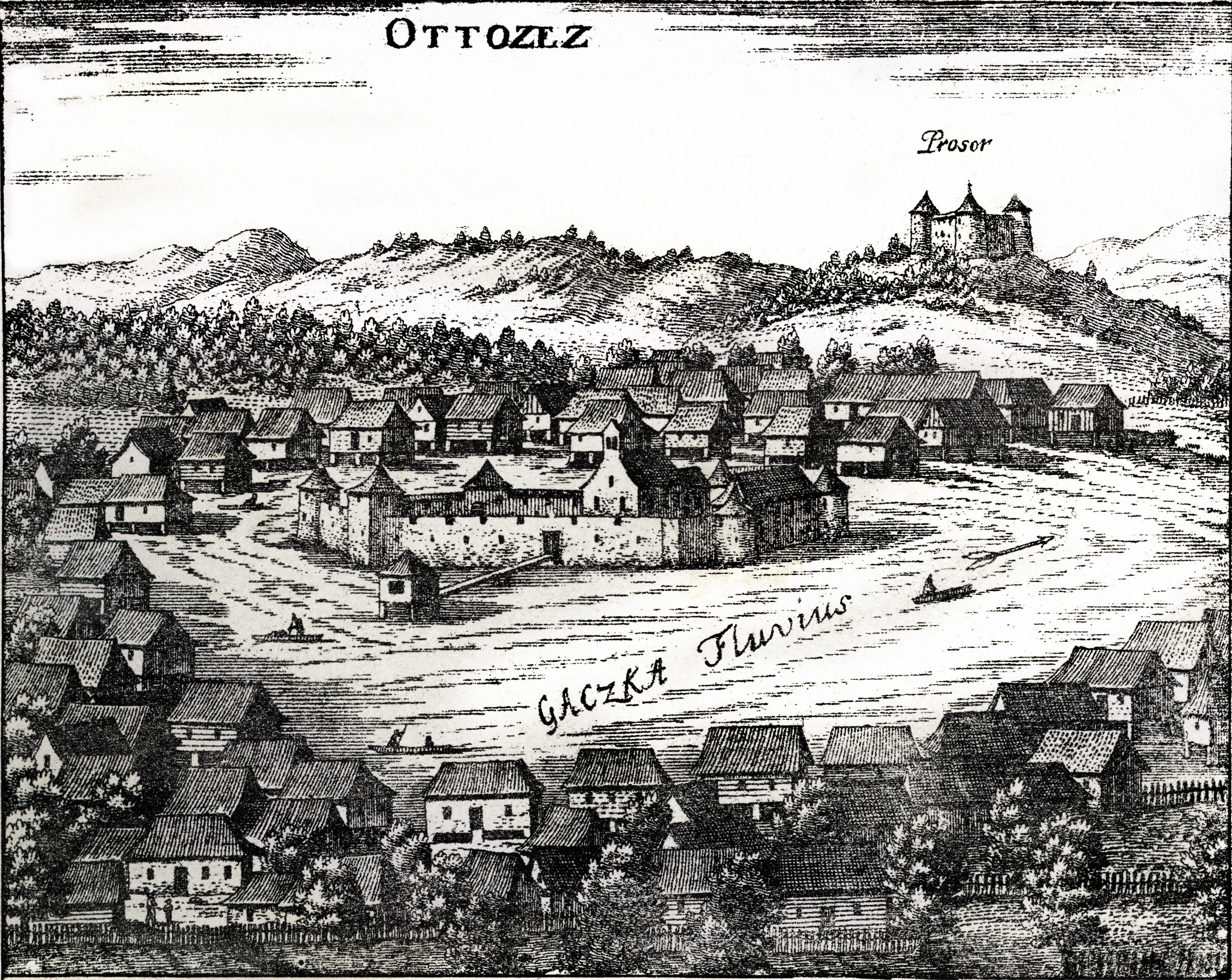
- Contemporary view of Otočac with the surroundings where the battle took place (including Prozor Castle in the background)
Date	24 August (?) 1543
Location	Otočac, Kingdom of Croatia in the Habsburg Monarchy
Result	Croatian victory

Belligerents
Habsburg monarchy: Kingdom of Croatia	Ottoman Empire

Commanders and leaders
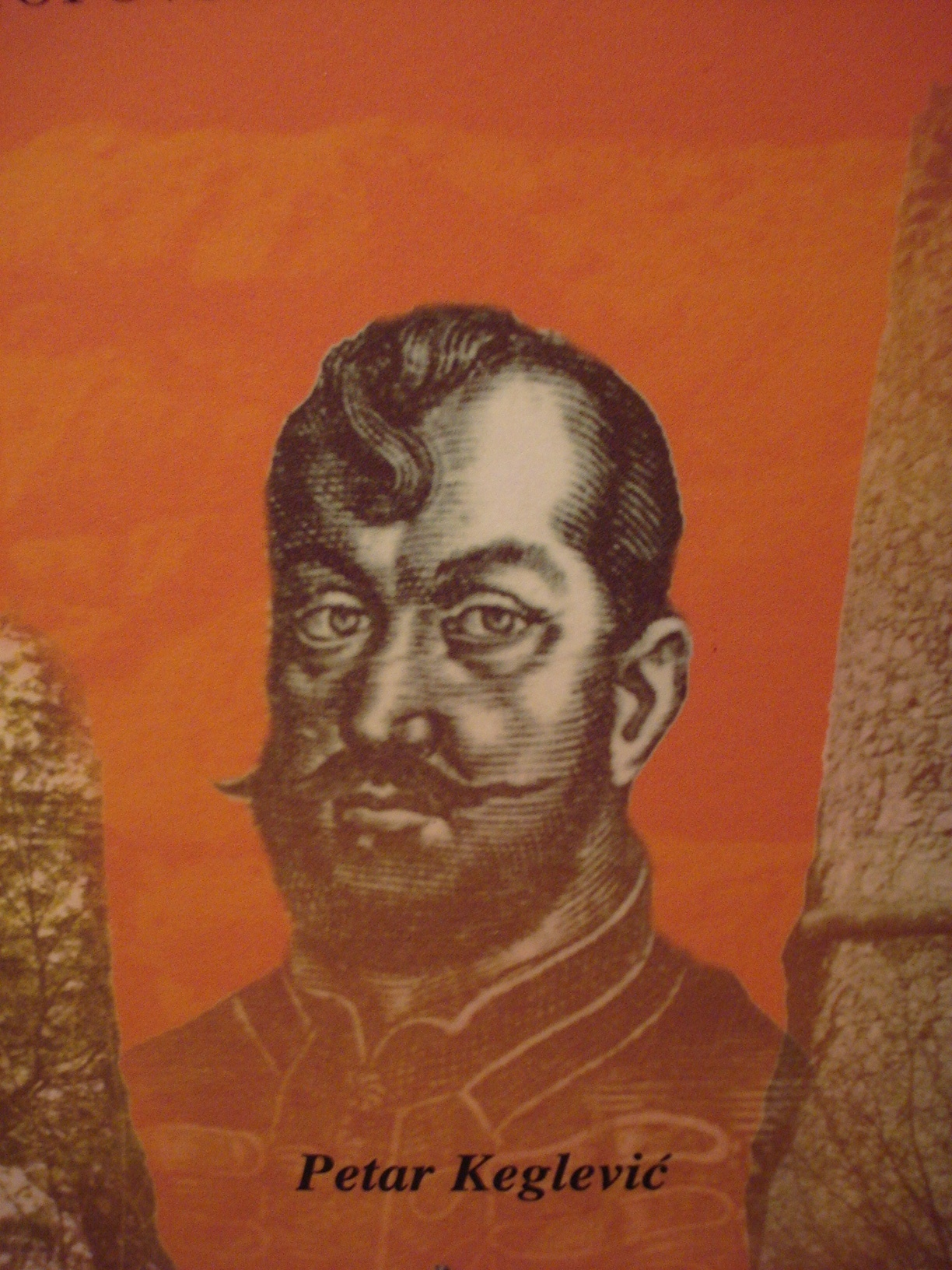
former Croatian ban Petar Keglević, Juraj Frankopan Slunjski, Nikola Frankopan Tržački, Stjepan Babonić Blagajski	(Ottoman Empire) Bosnian Sanjak-beg Ulama-bey (?)

Strength
Unknown	Unknown

Casualties and losses
Unknown	Unknown

The Battle of Otočac 1543 was a military conflict between the forces of the Kingdom of Croatia (within the Habsburg Monarchy) and the invading army of the Ottoman Empire. It took place near the town of Otočac in the Lika region, Central Croatia. As one of the numerous Croatian battles with the Ottoman Turks at that time, it was a clash whose exact date is not determined with certainty, but it most probably occurred on 24 August 1543. The Croatian army was led by the former Croatian Ban Petar Keglević followed by many distinguished Croatian noblemen. The battle ended in a decisive victory for the Croatian forces.

== Background ==
Sultan Suleiman the Magnificent ascended the Turkish throne on 30 September 1520 and immadiately began a series of military conquests on the Balkans. His army gradually penetrated Croatia and occupied its territories. It also advanced towards Lika, most of which it conquered by 1526. However, the northwestern part of this Croatian province, including Otočac, managed to defend itself. Many clashes between Croatian and Ottoman forces followed in the years to come, but the state border remained unchanged not far from the town, at Prozor village. A fortress in Prozor was crucial for the defense of Gacko polje, a large field area in northwestern Lika, from Turkish attacks and there was a big border stone block there. The defense of Otočac itself from the Turkish invasion was also contributed by the good location of Otočac Fortress, which was surrounded by the backwaters of the Gacka River on marshy terrain. For invaders it was very difficult to access from the surrounding solid land.

== Battle ==
In the late summer of 1543, the Turks set out on another of their conquering and plundering campaigns towards the Otočac area. Petar Keglević, former Croatian Ban, gathered Croatian soldiers, together with Croatian nobles Juraj III Frankopan Slunjski, Nikola VIII Frankopan Tržački and Stjepan IX Babonić Blagajski, and set out to confront the invaders. He succeedded in stopping them from conquering Otočac and their further penetration into the Croatian territory. Shortly before, Keglević had been replaced as Croatian Ban by Nikola Šubić Zrinski, because of conflict over the possession of Čakovec Castle. He had to move out of the castle by order of King Ferdinand of Habsburg, but he refused.

It is not known who personally led the Ottomans at the battle of Otočac, but it is known that the governor of the Bosnian Sanjak was a Sanjak-beg named Ulama-beg. It is also not known the exact location and time of the battle, but some sources state that it took place on 24 August 1543.

The course of the battle, as well as its duration, are also not recorded anywhere. It is known that Croats won the battle and prevented the Ottoman capture of Otočac. Moreover, when Bihać, Ostrožac, Tržac, Kladuša, Bužim, Zrin, Gvozdansko, Kostajnica and many other Croatian strongholds later fell into Turkish hands, Otočac did not suffer the same fate, but managed to stay on the Croatian side of the border.

== Aftermath ==
Realizing the impregnability of the Otočac fortress, the Habsburg Monarchy military, upon the formation of the Croatian Military Frontier in 1553, established the headquarters of the captaincy in Otočac. In 1619, a group of Uskoks who were displaced from Senj and moved to Otočac, built the Fortica fortress on a hill north of the town, which strengthened the defensive power of the town and that part of the military frontier. Battles against the Ottomans in the Otočac area were fought until their expulsion from Lika in 1689. In the 18th century Empress and Queen Maria Theresa elevated Otočac to the level of headquarters of a regiment, one of the four regiments in the Karlovac Generalate: Otočac Regiment, Slunj Regiment, Ogulin Regiment and Lika Regiment

== See also ==
- Battle at Jurjeve Stijene
- List of battles 1301–1600
- Ottoman period in the history of Croatia
- Antemurale Christianitatis
