= Kompolje =

Kompolje may refer to several places:

== Croatia ==
- Kompolje Koreničko, a village near Plitvička Jezera, Croatia
- Kompolje, Otočac, a village in Croatia

== Slovenia ==
- Kompolje, Dobrepolje, a village in Slovenia
- Kompolje, Lukovica, a village in Slovenia
- Kompolje, Sevnica, a village in Slovenia
- Male Kompolje, a village near Ivančna Gorica, Slovenia
- Velike Kompolje, a village near Ivančna Gorica, Slovenia
