= 1st Home Guard Battalion Pula =

- Active: April 30, 1992 - 1999
- Country: Croatia
- Branch: Croatian Ground Army
- Type: Mechanized infantry
- Garrison/HQ: Pula, Ramljani, Croatia
- Nickname(s): Nonići, Suri, Strile, Zogaduri
- Anniversaries: 30 April
- Engagements: Croatian War of Independence

Commanders
- First lieutenant: Boris Ružić

The 1st Home Guard Battalion Pula (HV) (Croatian: 1. domobranska bojna Pula), nicknamed Nonići, Suri, Strile, and Zogaduri was a Croatian Army guards brigade composed of conscripts from Pula and nearby towns. It was formed on April 30, 1992 by order of Croatian President Franjo Tuđman. The unit was the first Home Guard unit from Istria to be formed, and to take part in the Croatian War of Independence.

The unit is noted for the impeccable conduct of its soldiers. Its behaviour is said to have been an example to other units on the battlefield. It was the oldest unit of the Croatian Army.

== History ==
The unit was established in the building of the former Office of Defense, in the Forum of Pula in the premises of the former TO. It consisted mainly of conscripts from the former municipality of Pula (Pula, Ližnjan, Medulin, Vodnjan, Marčana, Barban), as well as from Rovinj, Pazin, Labin and Lupoglav.

The first task of the unit was to intervene in the event of an attack on Pula and its surroundings, to fight against sabotage and terrorist groups and to defend vital facilities of interest to Pula and the Republic of Croatia.

== War time ==
Pursuant to the Order of the Deputy Commander of the Gospić Military District, and to the Plan for the Engagement of Home Guard Units (class: 817-07 / 93-01-06, registration number: 1043-04-93-27 of 9 October 1993), 1st Home Guard Battalion Pula, as the first Home Guard unit from the Istria County, moved to the front line and on October 17, 1993, took over the 1st Company's defense over part of the defensive line of the village of Ramljani, Croatia (near Otočac), and was later joined by the 2nd, 3rd and 4th companies. Used to the mild Istrian winters, the soldiers had to get used quickly to the harsh winters of Lika, but adapted quickly, also supplying the local population and helping them to prepare firewood.

The unit was exposed to almost daily enemy fire from infantry weapons, while the 2nd Company was exposed to artillery fire for fifteen days. The task of the company was to defend the village of Ramljani. In addition to monitoring the movements of enemy troops and reporting them to the Headquarters, the battalion made shelters for observation and combat operations, and prepared in the event of heavy artillery or mortar fire.

Thanks to "good organization, military discipline, as well as pre-built and prepared shelters and dugouts", the unit was able to stay without victims throughout the continuous fire of March 1993.

The battalion was located mainly in the Ramljani barracks, where there was also an Independent Home Guard Company composed of refugee home guards from Korenica, so in the beginning positions were shared with them. The battalion also developed a war surgical reception clinic for the wounded, and a small pharmacy with medicines. The battalion commander was Lieutenant Boris Ružić, his deputies: Vladimir Rojnić and Anton Borina, lieutenants Nevio Šetić and Boris Ušić. It successfully defended the village of Ramljani, which was entrusted to them.

The unit was demobilized on May 2, 1994. An order followed to form an intervention company from the battalion for a speedy dispatch to the front line and to stay ready for combat, which was carried out. Due to its good organization and cooperation with the trucking company, the unit could be used before the ordered deadline. The unit was shut down on July 13, 1999 due to the reorganization of the HV. During the war, the unit was also visited by media representatives, and published articles in newspapers.

The unit is noted for the conduct of its soldiers, who were always ready to take action but never willing to "retaliate against the provocations of the enemy." Its behaviour is said to have been an example to other units on the battlefield. The unit was also praised for its medical staff and its organization, taking care of the health of the company members but also of the wounded among the local population.

The 1st company self-nicknamed themselves Nonići, the 2nd Suri, Strile and the 3rd Zogaduri, all from the local Pula dialect. Nonići means "oldsters", "grandpas", probably referring to the advanced age of the unit. Suri means "gray", and makes the same allusion. Strile means arrows, referring to the unit's quickness, while zogaduri is a word in the jargon of the game of briscola, popular in Croatia, especially in Istria.

Just like the city of Pula, the composition of the brigade was multiethnic, with 13 Serbs and four Slovenes, and also one Czech and one Hungarian.

== See also ==
- HV 119th Brigade
- 154th Brigade HV
