= Petrlić =

Croatian surname

Petrlić is a Croatian surname.

It originates from the mountainous region of Lika, mostly from the areas surrounding Otočac and Gospić. Its meaning derives from the Greek name Peter, and it is thought that the original bearers of this surname were stone carvers and constructors of stone objects.

Although the surname comes from Lika, due to migrations during the 20th century, around half of the people who bear the surname can be found outside of Lika, mostly in the capital of Zagreb and its suburbs. Outside of Zagreb, Petrlić families outside of Lika also reside in the cities of Bjelovar, Križevci, Sisak, and in the Čazma area.

The majority of the Petrlić families who are still living in Lika reside in the village of Lički Osik in the outskirts of Gospić, and in the village of Ramljani outside of Otočac. The surname is the 14th most common in the former, and the 8th most common in the latter.

Like with many other Croatian surnames, people with the surname Petrlić are often found in the Croatian diaspora, with the majority of these members living in Germany, the United States, Canada, and Australia.

Petrlić is the 6th most common surname in the village of Pobjenik near Čazma.

It may refer to:

- Josip Petrlić Pjer, Croatian author
