= Battle at Jurjeve Stijene =

17th-century battle

- Part of the Austro-Turkish War (1663–1664)
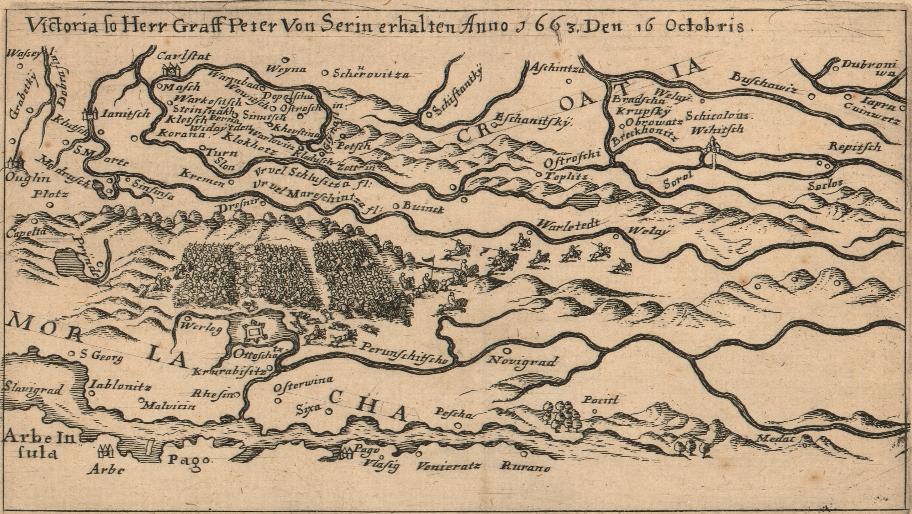
- Map of Croatia commemorating the battle at Jurjeve Stijene (c. 1680)
Date	16 October 1663
Location	Jurjeve Stijene, near Otočac, Kingdom of Croatia, Habsburg monarchy present-day Croatia
Result	Habsburg Croatian victory

Belligerents
Habsburg Monarchy: Kingdom of Croatia	Ottoman Empire

Commanders and leaders
Petar Zrinski	(Ottoman Empire) Ali-pasha Čengić (POW)

Strength
2,000–2,500	8,000–10,000

Casualties and losses
Unknown	1,500–2,000 killed hundreds captured

The Battle at Jurjeve Stijene (Croatian: Bitka kod Jurjevih Stijena) was fought on 16 October 1663, at a canyon near Otočac in the Habsburg Kingdom of Croatia between the forces of Petar Zrinski, at the time captain of Senj, Ogulin and Primorje, and the forces of the Ottoman Empire under Ali-Pasha Čengić of the Eyalet of Bosnia.

== Background ==
Following his initial successes against the Ottomans, Petar Zrinski was appointed captain of Senj, Ogulin and Primorje in 1658. During the wars in Transylvania, the Ottoman commander Ali-pasha Čengić planned to conquer the town of Otočac, and then carry out an invasion of Carniola. The high commander of the military frontier, Herbert Auersperg, withdrew to Ljubljana during this occasion.

== Battle ==
Being aware of considerable numerical superiority of the Ottoman army, Zrinski decided to launch an attack in a location most detrimental to such an advantage and chose the exit of a canyon near Jurjeve stijene (George's rock), which was near the town of Otočac. His plan was to surprise the Ottomans with 2,000 frontier soldiers and make it unable for them to turn to military formation utilizing approximately 8,000–10,000 soldiers. A thorough strategic preparation came to fruition, as the Ottoman army crossed the expected route at dawn on October 16 and were attacked at the exit from the canyon with all available means. Cavalry charged at them with sabres, which were additionally supported by infantry muskets. The Ottomans were surprised by the attack, causing panic and disarray, and about 1,500–2,000 were killed, with many hundreds captured, including the commander Ali-Pasha Čengić himself. Zrinski's army ended with only a few casualties.

== Aftermath ==
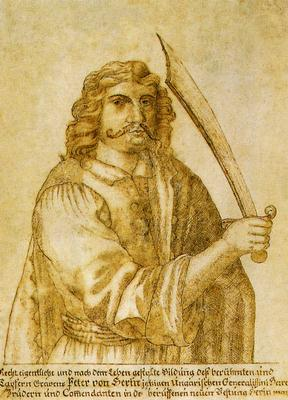
Petar Zrinski on an engraving

The victory of the Christian army was overshadowed by later events, as the supreme commander of the military frontier, general Herbart Auersperg accused Zrinski of attacking the Ottomans without the previous agreement with him. Ultimately, Zrinski was forced to hand over all plunder and high ranking prisoners to him. The complete victory over the army from the Bosnian Eyalet marked the end of further Ottoman advance into Gacka, and prevented continuous future invasions from Bosnia into Croatian territory. The victory was celebrated abroad in Germany and Italy.

== See also ==
- Battle of Otočac (1543)
- List of battles 1601–1800
- Ottoman period in the history of Croatia
- Antemurale Christianitatis
