= Aralica =

Aralica is a Serbian and Croatian surname. It may refer to:

- Ante Aralica (born 1996), Croatian footballer
- Ivan Aralica (born 1930), Yugoslav and Croatian novelist and essayist
- Stojan Aralica (1883–1980), Yugoslav and Serbian painter and academic
