= Fortica =

Fortica may refer to:

- Fortica, Omiš, a medieval fortress near Omiš in Split-Dalmatia county, Croatia
- Fortica, Otočac, a ruined early modern fortified structure in Otočac, Lika-Senj County, Croatia
- Fortica, Novigrad, a castle above Novigrad in Zadar County, Croatia
- Fortica, Hvar, a fortress above Hvar, Split-Dalmatia County, Croatia
