= Dabar, Lika-Senj County =

Dabar
- Naselje
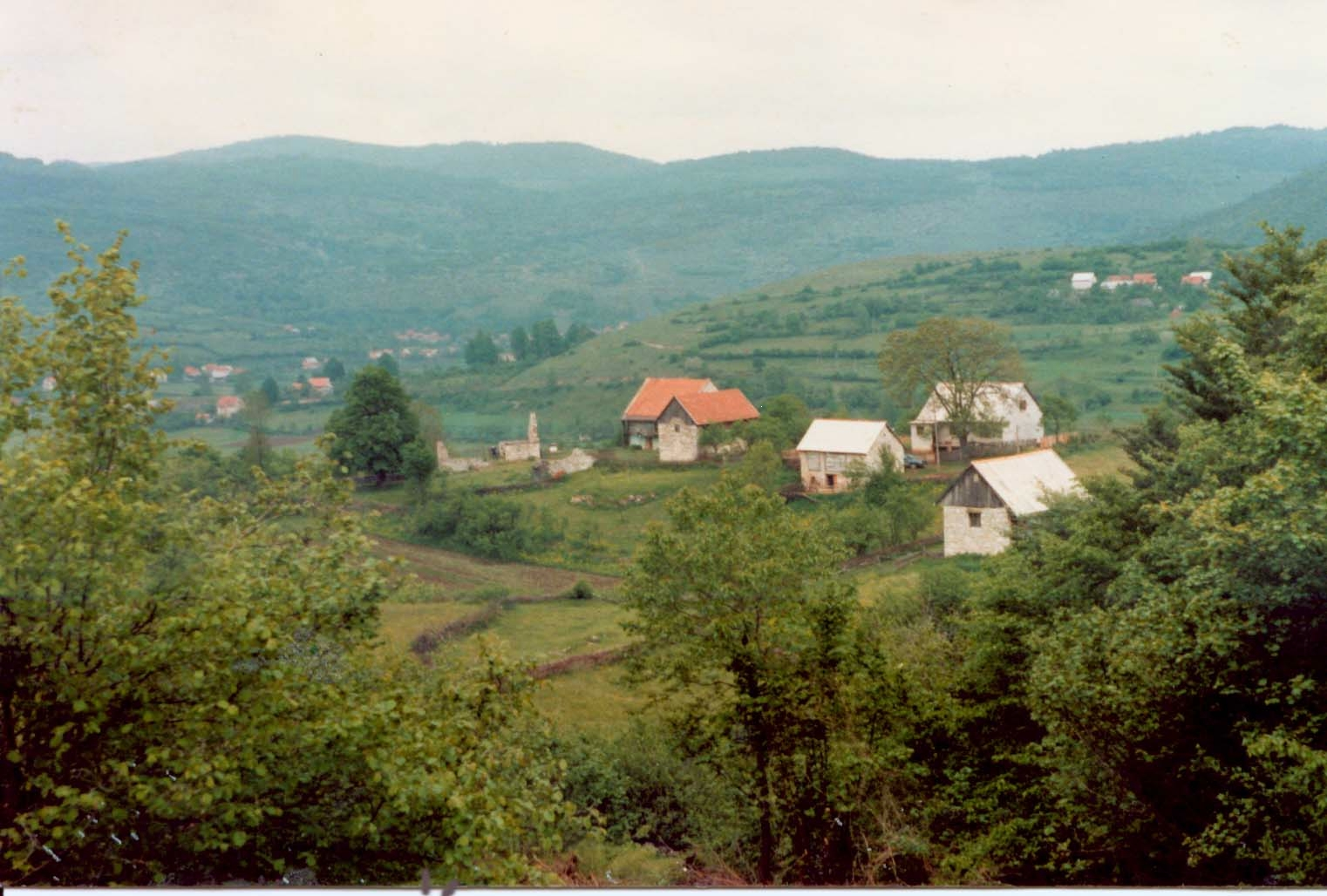
- Scattered settlement Dabar.

- Location of Dabar in Croatia
- Coordinates: 44°57′18″N 15°18′10″E
- Country: Croatia
- County: Lika-Senj County
- Town: Otočac

Area
  - Total: 92.2 km^{2} (35.6 sq mi)
- Elevation: 552 m (1,811 ft)

Population (2021)
  - Total: 59
  - Density: 0.64/km^{2} (1.7/sq mi)
- Time zone: UTC+1 (CET)
  - Summer (DST): UTC+2 (CEST)
- Postal code: 53222
- Area code: +385-53
- License plates: GS

Dabar is a village in Croatia, 21 km northeast of Otočac and a part of the Town of Otočac municipality.

== History ==
The ruins of a fortress called by the folk Sokolić rise on Vučjak hill; it has a square ground-plan and one cylindrical angle tower. First mentioned in 1499 as a fortress of the Frankopans, remained a borderline stronghold until the Turks were expelled from Lika. In 1773 already a "completely demolished town".

== Gallery ==
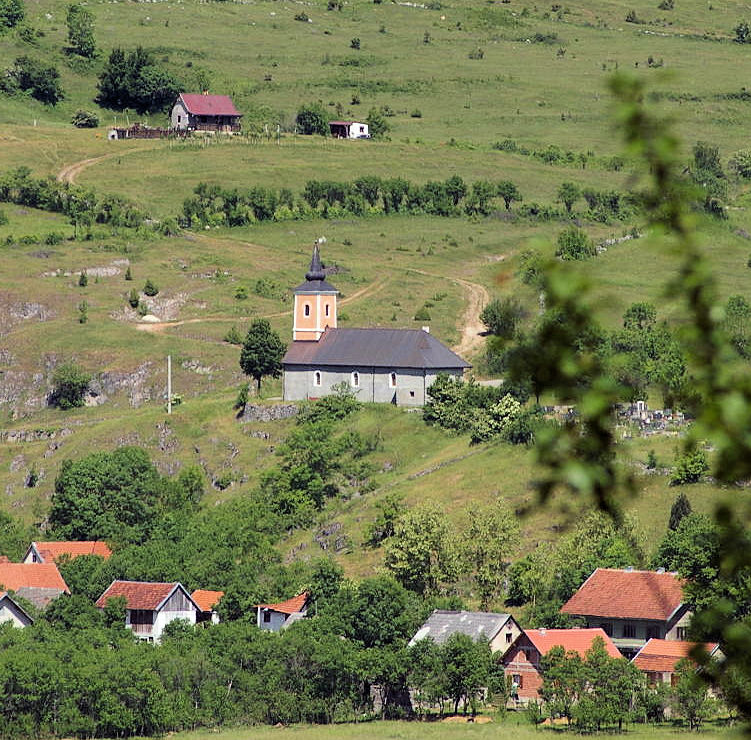
Main catholic church

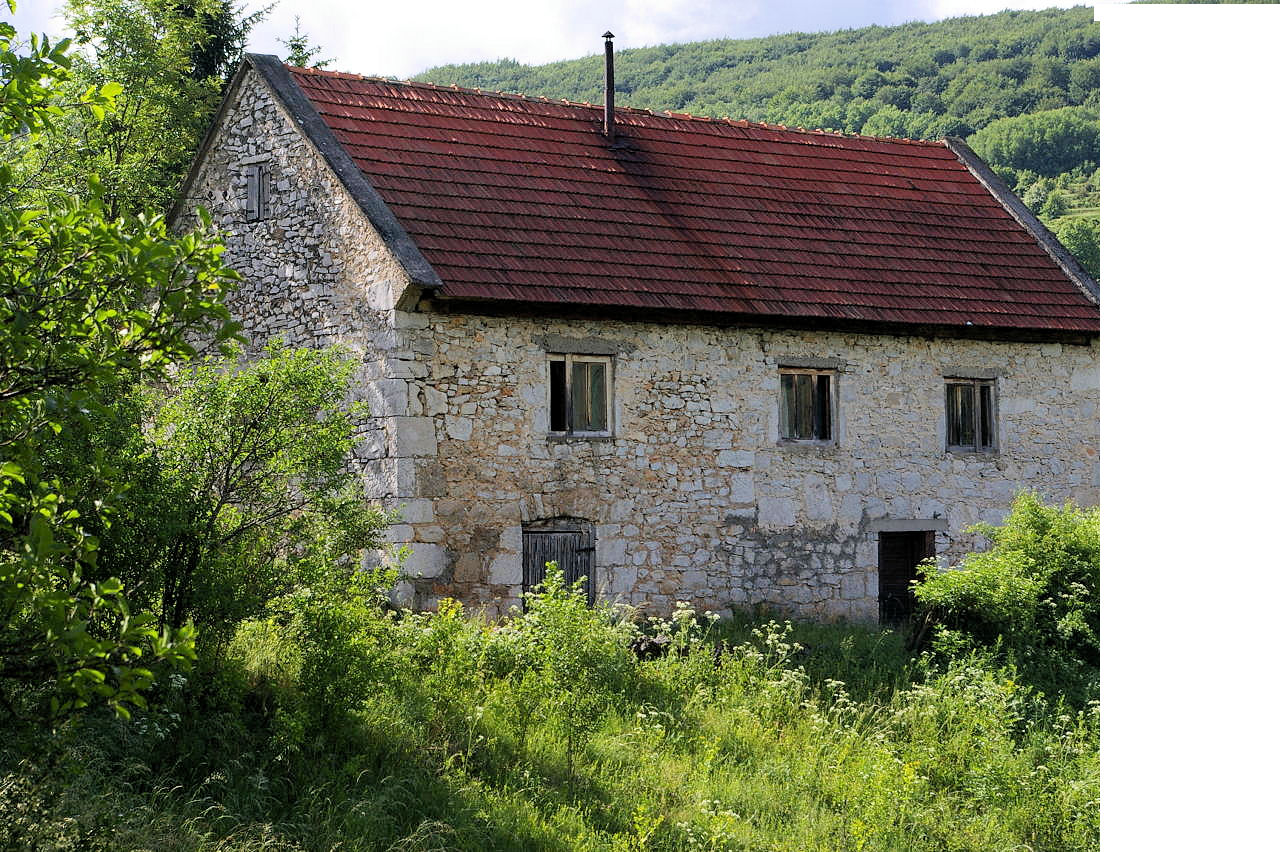
Nekić House, the former homestead

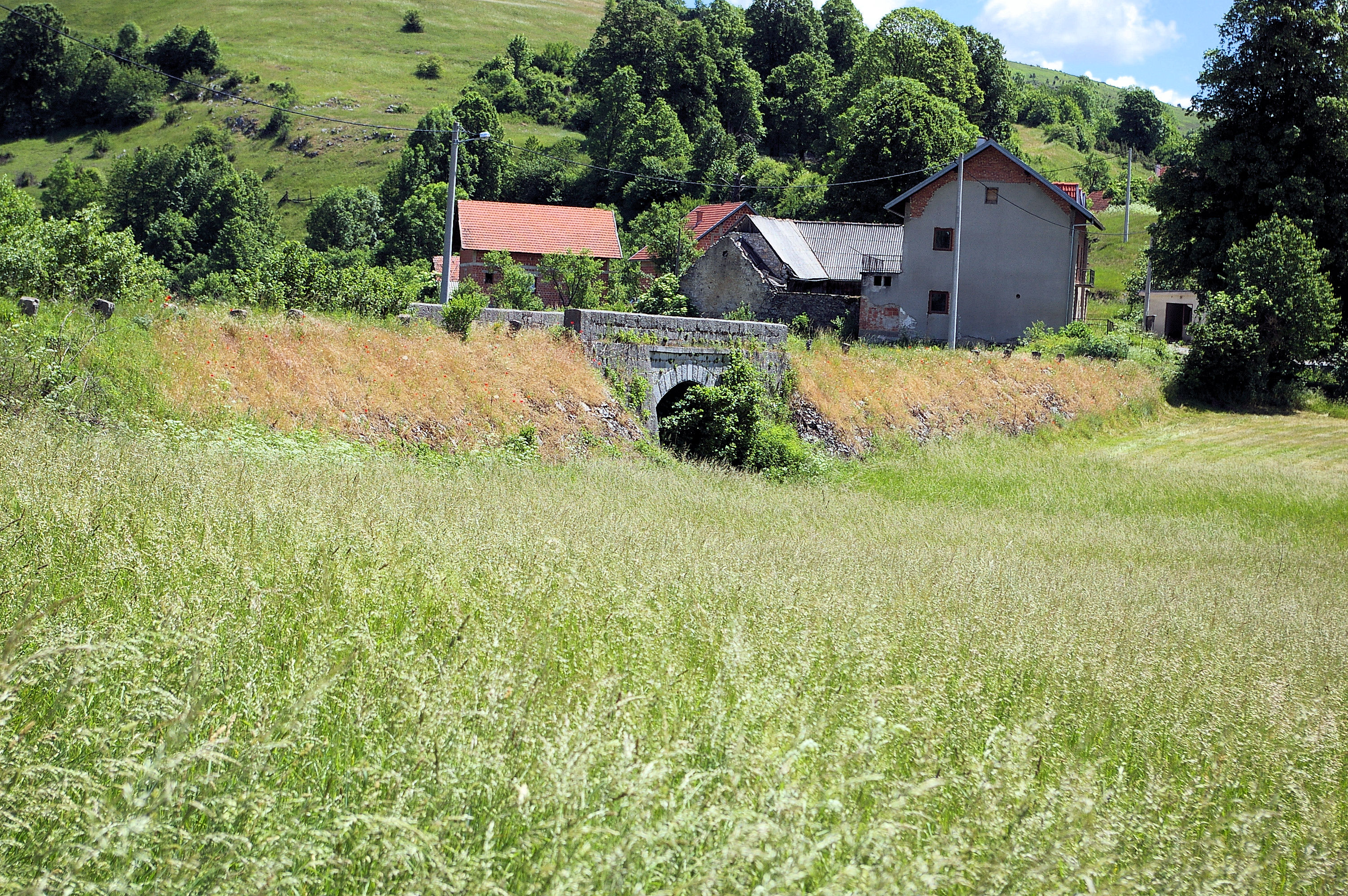
Bridge of Dabar. Geographically, the lowest point
