= Čovići =

- Village
- Location within Croatia
- Coordinates: 44°49′41″N 15°18′04″E
- Country: Croatia
- County: Lika-Senj
- Municipality: Otočac

Area
  - Total: 19.2 km^{2} (7.4 sq mi)
- Elevation: 453 m (1,486 ft)

Population (2021)
  - Total: 520
  - Density: 27/km^{2} (70/sq mi)
- Time zone: UTC+1 (CET)
  - Summer (DST): UTC+2 (CEST)
- Postal code: 53220
- Area code: + (385)

Čovići is a village in Otočac municipality in Lika-Senj County, Croatia.
