= Ponori, Croatia =

Ponori
- Village
- Location within Croatia
- Coordinates: 44°52′09″N 15°08′28″E
- Country: Croatia
- County: Lika-Senj
- Municipality: Otočac

Area
  - Total: 11.3 km^{2} (4.4 sq mi)
- Elevation: 471 m (1,545 ft)

Population (2021)
  - Total: 42
  - Density: 3.7/km^{2} (9.6/sq mi)
- Time zone: UTC+1 (CET)
  - Summer (DST): UTC+2 (CEST)
- Postal code: 53220
- Area code: + (385)

Ponori is a village in Otočac municipality in Lika-Senj County, Croatia.
