= Fortica Fortress in Otočac =

Fortica Fortress
- Otočac, Lika-Senj County, Croatia
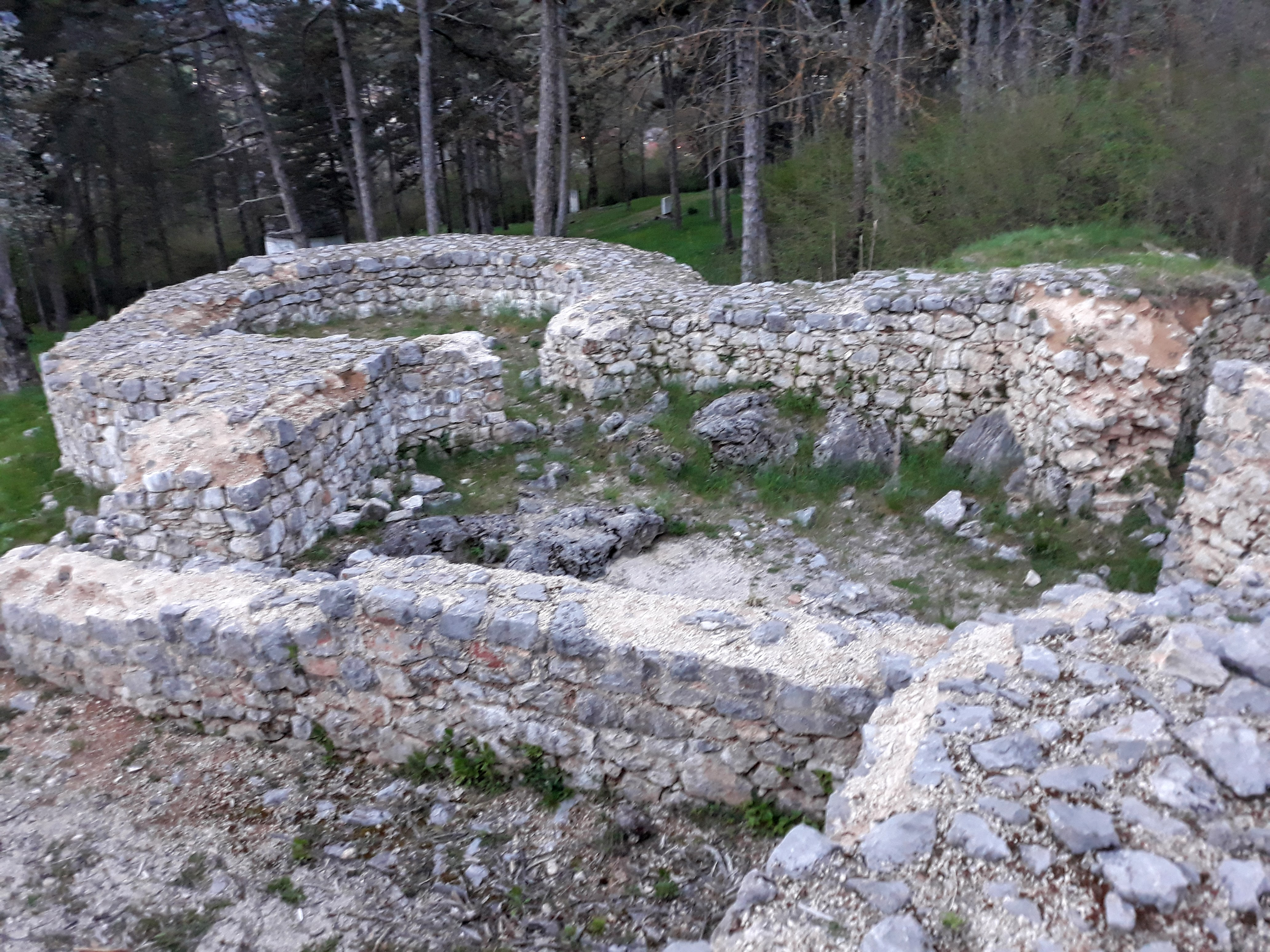
- Remains of the ruined fortress

Site information
- Type: Hilltop castle
- Controlled by: Forces of the Croatian Military Frontier
- Condition: ruins

Location
- Location within Croatia
- Coordinates: 44.87940°N 15.24370°E

Site history
- Built: 1619 - ~1630
- Built by: Military Administration of the Croatian Military Frontier
- Materials: rough-hewn stone

Fortica Fortress (Croatian: Tvrđava Fortica) is a ruined early modern fortified structure in the town of Otočac, Lika-Senj County, Croatia. Built on the top of a flat hill at the northern end of the town, it overlooks a large part of Otočac and Gacka River valley. Once a military-defensive stronghold on the line of defense against Ottoman Turks, it turned later slowly, by the end of the Ottoman wars during the 19th century, being uncared-for, into a ruin. Recently, the fortress has been partially restored.

== History ==
The fortress was built on the foundations of a medieval fortification existing in 1449 during the partition of huge Frankopan estates among the sons of the powerful Croatian ban Nikola IV Frankopan. Together with Otočac and the surrounding area, it belonged to Žikmund (Sigismund) Frankopan, one of Nikola's sons. The construction of the new fortress began in 1619 and ended around 1630. It was built by uskoks and Military Administration of the Croatian Military Frontier. Its purpose was to protect the town of Otočac (which was located a few hundred meters south on the river islet surrounded by the tributaries of the Gacka River), especially from the Ottoman Turks.

Built from the cut stone, it was a firm stronghold of Croatian military forces to fight against incoming Ottoman danger in the 17th century. The mighty conquerors from the east came as far as Prozor area, where there was a frontier, but not further to the west. With the reduction of the Ottoman threat at the end of the 17th century and the liberation of the Lika region, the fortress lost its original significance and purpose, so it housed, among others, military officers and staff out of work.

At the beginning of the 19th century, the fortress increasingly lost its importance at all and became somewhat neglected. However, it is known for sure that the fortress was rebuilt in 1804, and the paintings from 1861 show that it still existed. At that time it served as a gunpowder warehouse and the captain lived in it. In the second half of the 19th century, the fortress was fully abandoned, and the stones from its walls were taken by the locals to build their houses. At the end, only the remains of the walls were hidden in the forest and bushes.

== Architecture ==
In the ground plan Fortica consists of three, once two-storey, round towers at its ends, which are connected by short flat connecting walls about 1,8-2,0 meters thick. In many ways, it was similar to that one in Sisak, which was built about eighty years earlier (around 1550), and was larger in size. The largest tower of the Fortica was in the east, while the other two, the one in the northwest and the one in the southwest, were in slightly smaller diameter. All three towers were covered with circular conical roofs. Until recent days, only the foundations with the remains of the walls have survived from the original fortress.

The fortress was built of smaller pieces of stone, probably because there was no time or money for larger carved blocks. There was a water tank in the narrow courtyard between the towers, and storage for food, gunpowder and other equipment was mostly in the towers. The entrance door to the fortress was located high above the ground, so at first it could only be entered with a ladder, and later a porch with stairs was built. Relatively small in size, the Fortica had an optimal capacity for about fifty defenders.

== Gallery ==
| One of the towers of the fortress | Walls of the fortress | Excavations |

== See also ==
- List of castles in Croatia
- Timeline of Croatian history
- Military history of Croatia
