= Škare =

- Village
- Location within Croatia
- Coordinates: 44°53′28″N 15°18′43″E
- Country: Croatia
- County: Lika-Senj
- Municipality: Otočac

Area
  - Total: 23.6 km^{2} (9.1 sq mi)
- Elevation: 494 m (1,621 ft)

Population (2021)
  - Total: 36
  - Density: 1.5/km^{2} (4.0/sq mi)
- Time zone: UTC+1 (CET)
  - Summer (DST): UTC+2 (CEST)
- Postal code: 53220
- Area code: + (385)

Škare is a village in Otočac municipality in Lika-Senj County, Croatia.

== Notable individuals ==
- Stojan Aralica
