= Drenov Klanac =

- Village
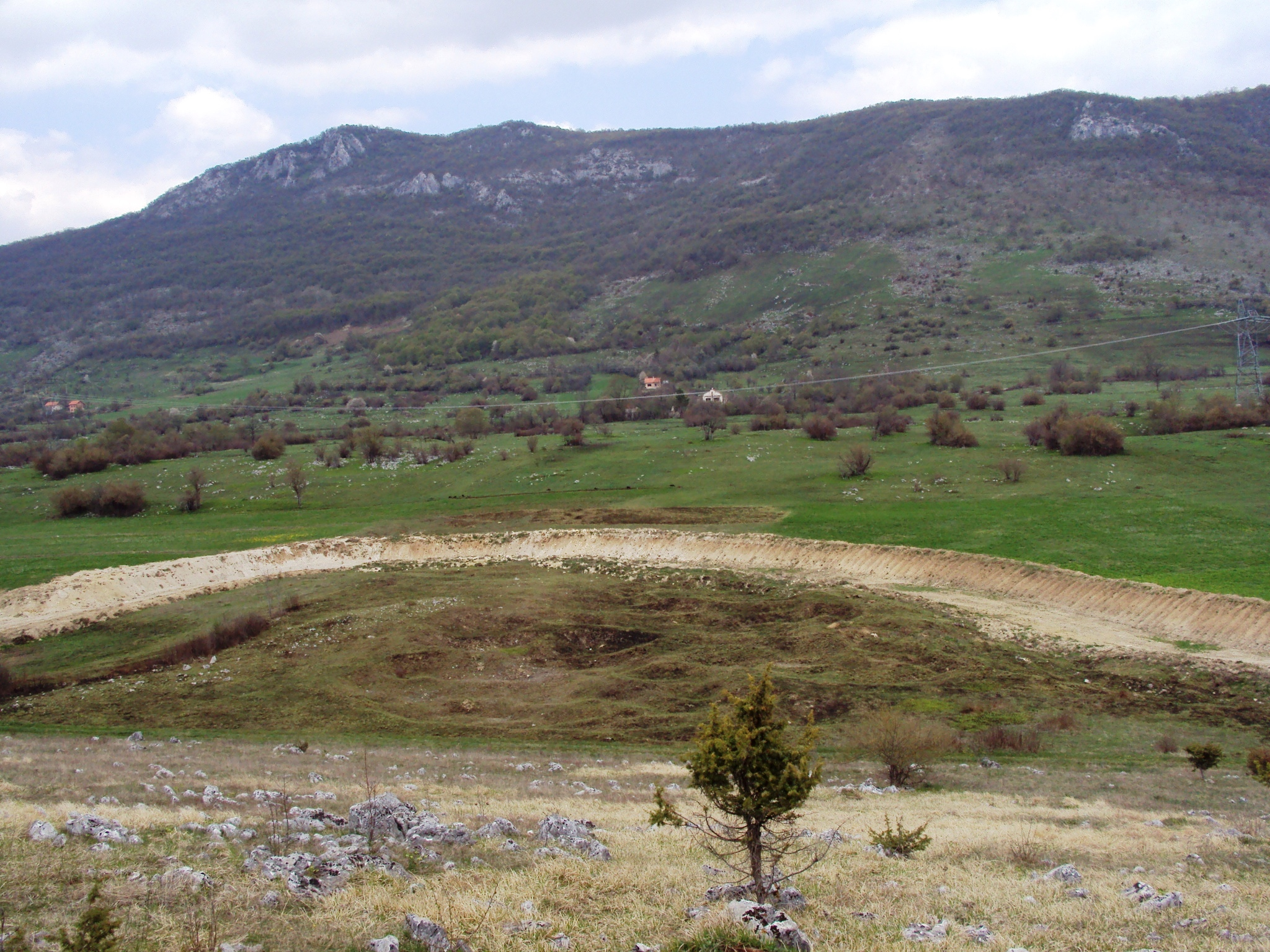

- Location within Croatia
- Coordinates: 44°56′14″N 15°11′54″E
- Country: Croatia
- County: Lika-Senj
- Municipality: Otočac

Area
  - Total: 20.4 km^{2} (7.9 sq mi)
- Elevation: 463 m (1,519 ft)

Population (2021)
  - Total: 31
  - Density: 1.5/km^{2} (3.9/sq mi)
- Time zone: UTC+1 (CET)
  - Summer (DST): UTC+2 (CEST)
- Postal code: 53220
- Area code: + (385)

Drenov Klanac is a village in Otočac municipality in Lika-Senj County, Croatia.
