= 154th Brigade (Croatia) =

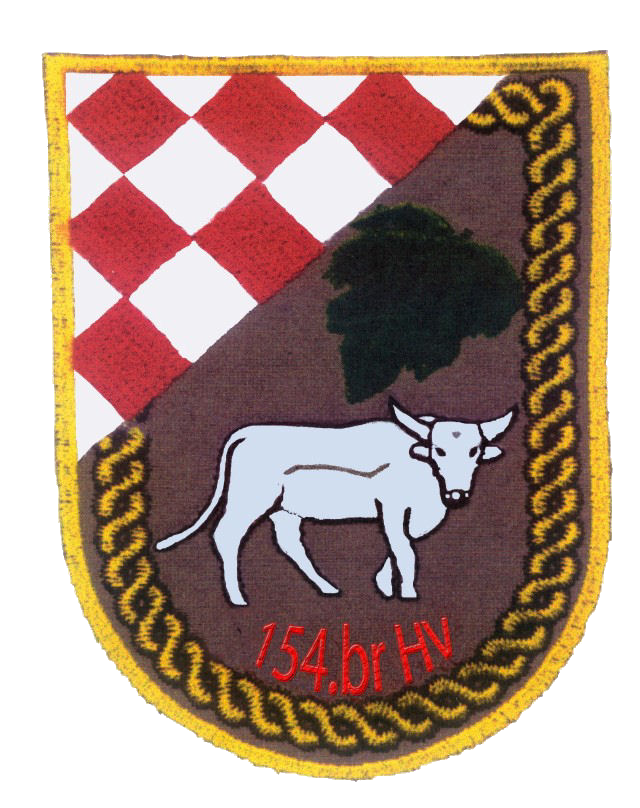
- Active: 1991 – 2004
- Country: Croatia
- Branch: Ground Army
- Type: Mechanized infantry
- Garrison/HQ: Pazin
- Nickname(s): boškarini
- Anniversaries: 1 December
- Engagements: Croatian War of Independence: Operation Storm

The 154th Brigade (Croatian: 154. brigada) - named "The Boškarins of Pazin" (Croatian: Pazinski boškarini) - was a Croatian Army guards brigade composed of conscripts from Pazin, Labin, Poreč, Umag, Buje and Buzet. Together with the 1st Home Guard Battalion Pula and the HV 119th Brigade it is one of the military units from Istria employed in the Croatian War of Independence. The unit was active in Otočac, where it was employed in the defense of the city, and participated in the Operation Oluja. The brigade was active from 1991 to 2004.

== History ==
In December 1991 began with the accelerated organization and training of this unit, at first headquartered in Pazin's home of veterans (now the building of the County Services and the Commercial Court).

The day of establishment of the company is 1 December 1991. The brigade was formed in Pazin. It was composed of conscripts from Pazin, Labin, Poreč, Umag, Buje and Buzet.

In mid-December, the entire war command of the brigade and some units were mobilized, especially the sabotage, anti-sabotage and air defense platoons.

Already at that time, the sabotage and anti-sabotage platoon and the air defense platoons in Pazin and Poreč were given clear tasks, and on 26 December 1991 these units were either engaged in combat or ready for action. At the same time, the logistics company was fixing up the Veli Jože barracks for the reception of the main combat forces, the organization thereof, and the accelerated training and preparation for taking over tasks on the Lika frontier. The brigade organized into three combat battalions, combat support units, contingent units and logistics units.

Following orders from the OZ Rijeka, in early April 1992 the brigade took over combat missions on the Lika battlefield, first as an operational reserve of the commander of OG Lika, and in May of the same year as a defensive force on the front line in Ivčević kosa.

In 1993, the brigade organized part of its forces in the area of Lički Osik, Mušaluk and Budački most.

The year 1994 was for the brigade perhaps the most intense from the aspect of staying on the battlefield. That year, in the period from January to May, the brigade defended the town of Otočac in a very demanding defensive task. After the reorganization of 154th no. HV into 154th dp HV (by reorganizing, the brigade was additionally strengthened with a larger number of men and combat equipment), the brigade moved to the area of Perušićka kosa in mid-September. Here, in a geographically, climatically and tactically very demanding area, it organized a defense on the line that stretches from Sinac through Ramljan, Pocrnić to Alivojvodić, and on to Kosinj and Klanac.

In 1995, the 154th Home Guard Regiment continuously held the area of responsibility assigned to it, until the beginning of May.

During the Operation Storm, the regiment attacked the main forces in the direction of Ljubovo - Bunić, cooperating with the 9th Guards Brigade. In the auxiliary direction, it attacked with the left wing of Krbavsko polje. It then took part in the capture of Debeli brdo, the liberation of ZL Udbina, Podudbina and the town of Udbina. While doing so, it reorganized and prepared for further action.

In the next stage of hostilities, the regiment broke out on the state border on the river Una in the area of Nebljus. In its zone of responsibility, it quickly occupied the line of defense in the valley of the river Una: Štrbački Buk - Kestenovac - Poljica - Demirović Brdo; organized and conducted reconnaissance and created the conditions for possible offensive actions. A member of the Poreč battalion, Stipan Lijović, was killed in a clash with the JNA soldiers from Prekoun, while others were wounded in the same clash.

Following the Operation Storm, the regiment, although demobilized, continued its tasks of further developing, equipping and training. Intensive tasks were carried out to improve life and work in ZM Pazin. The unit created the so-called tank road (Pazin - Lindar), arranged and renewed the Veli Jože barracks, built the camp Lindar, distributed the water supply network in the village of Bertoši and a number of other activities.

Throughout the Croatian War of Independence, this unit was characterized by a high degree of responsibility and quick response to mobilization by all members of the brigade, and a high level of combat readiness of forces, (no going to the battlefield without prior reconnaissance, intensive training, action planning, logistical support, etc.); there was no occurrence of arbitrary leaving the unit or arbitrary and unplanned actions. Humanity and care for the comrade, but also the opponent, was another feature for which this unit is noted.

== See also ==
- 1st Home Guard Battalion Pula
- HV 119th Brigade
