= Lipovlje =

Settlement in Lika-Senj County, Croatia

- Settlement
- Interactive map of Lipovlje
- Location of Lipovlje in Croatia
- Coordinates: 44°50′37″N 15°09′50″E
- Country: Croatia
- County: Lika-Senj
- City: Otočac

Area
  - Total: 20.6 km^{2} (8.0 sq mi)

Population (2021)
  - Total: 158
  - Density: 7.67/km^{2} (19.9/sq mi)
- Time zone: UTC+1 (CET)
  - Summer (DST): UTC+2 (CEST)
- Postal code: 53220 Otočac
- Area code: +385 (0)53

Lipovlje is a settlement in the City of Otočac in Croatia. In 2021, its population was 158.

== Demographics ==
Lipovlje: Population trends 1857–2021
v

population				171	260	264	254	408	648	519	453	387	358	307	242	214	158
	1857	1869	1880	1890	1900	1910	1921	1931	1948	1953	1961	1971	1981	1991	2001	2011	2021

Sources: Croatian Bureau of Statistics publications
