= Doljani, Otočac =

Settlement in Lika-Senj County, Croatia

Doljani
- Settlement
- Interactive map of Doljani
- Location of Doljani in Croatia
- Coordinates: 44°53′10″N 15°20′48″E
- Country: Croatia
- County: Lika-Senj
- City: Otočac

Area
  - Total: 42.4 km^{2} (16.4 sq mi)

Population (2021)
  - Total: 75
  - Density: 1.8/km^{2} (4.6/sq mi)
- Time zone: UTC+1 (CET)
  - Summer (DST): UTC+2 (CEST)
- Postal code: 53220 Otočac
- Area code: +385 (0)53

Doljani is a settlement in the City of Otočac in Croatia. In 2021, its population was 75.

== Demographics ==
Doljani: Population trends 1857–2021
v

population	1145	1294	1099	1239	1375	1311	1226	1194	1032	970	845	735	565	548	14	95	75
	1857	1869	1880	1890	1900	1910	1921	1931	1948	1953	1961	1971	1981	1991	2001	2011	2021

Sources: Croatian Bureau of Statistics publications
