= Podum =

Settlement in Lika-Senj County, Croatia

- Settlement
- Interactive map of Podum
- Location of Podum in Croatia
- Coordinates: 44°53′10″N 15°17′10″E
- Country: Croatia
- County: Lika-Senj
- City: Otočac

Area
  - Total: 16.3 km^{2} (6.3 sq mi)

Population (2021)
  - Total: 128
  - Density: 7.85/km^{2} (20.3/sq mi)
- Time zone: UTC+1 (CET)
  - Summer (DST): UTC+2 (CEST)
- Postal code: 53220 Otočac
- Area code: +385 (0)53

Podum is a settlement in the City of Otočac in Croatia. In 2021, its population was 128.

== Demographics ==
Podum: Population trends 1857–2021
v

population	915	973	980	977	1123	1120	1090	1068	894	802	658	591	527	459	43	108	128
	1857	1869	1880	1890	1900	1910	1921	1931	1948	1953	1961	1971	1981	1991	2001	2011	2021

Sources: Croatian Bureau of Statistics publications
