= Kuterevo =

- Village
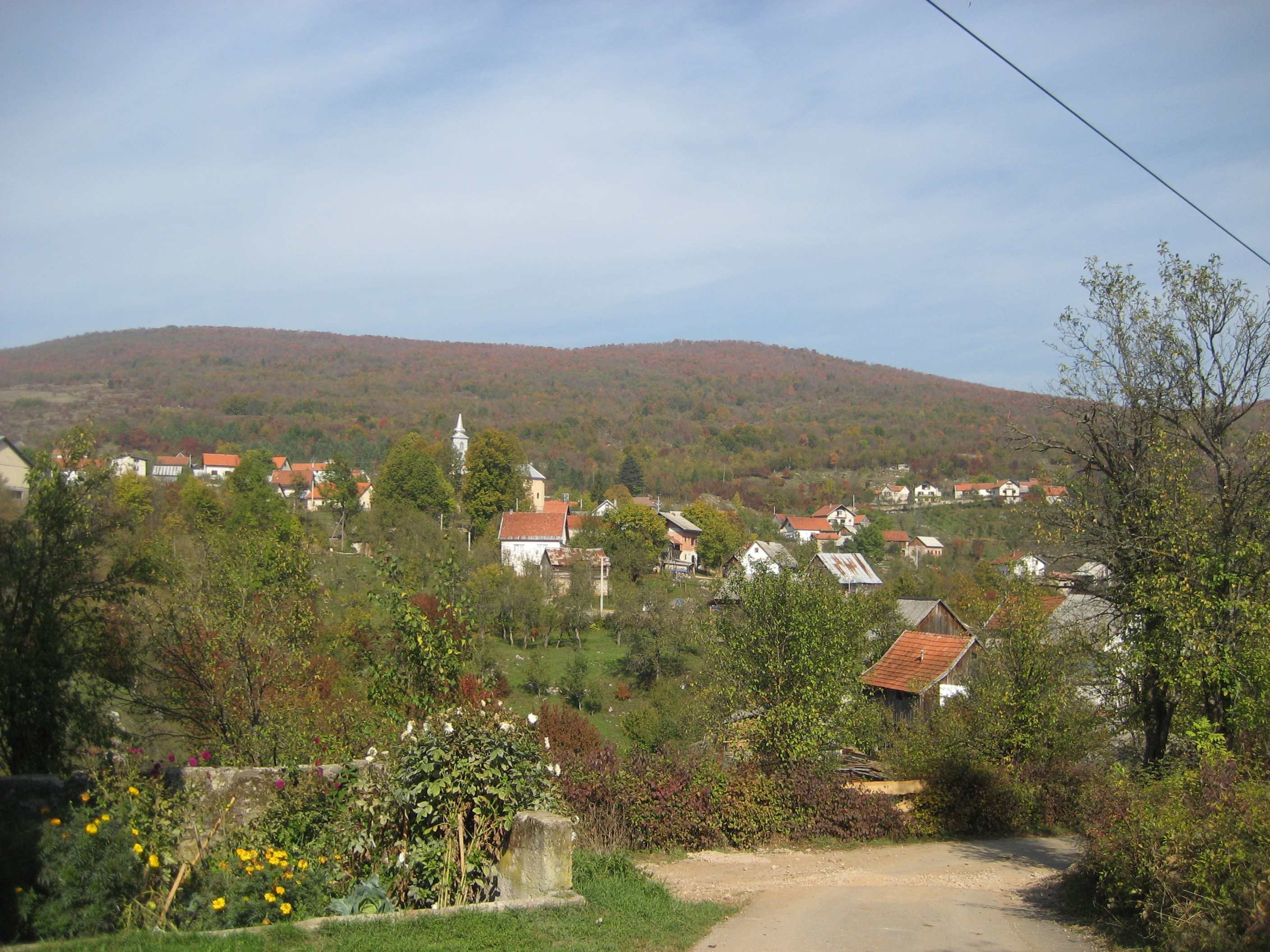

- Location within Croatia
- Coordinates: 44°49′31″N 15°08′27″E
- Country: Croatia
- County: Lika-Senj
- Municipality: Otočac

Area
  - Total: 25.9 km^{2} (10.0 sq mi)
- Elevation: 572 m (1,877 ft)

Population (2021)
  - Total: 385
  - Density: 14.9/km^{2} (38.5/sq mi)
- Time zone: UTC+1 (CET)
  - Summer (DST): UTC+2 (CEST)

Kuterevo is a village in Otočac municipality in Lika-Senj County, Croatia.

== Bear sanctuary ==
There is a bear sanctuary located in the village, which is a popular destination for tourists. The refuge cares for brown bears who have been separated from their mothers, and therefore lack the skills to survive on their own. It is open to visitors year round.

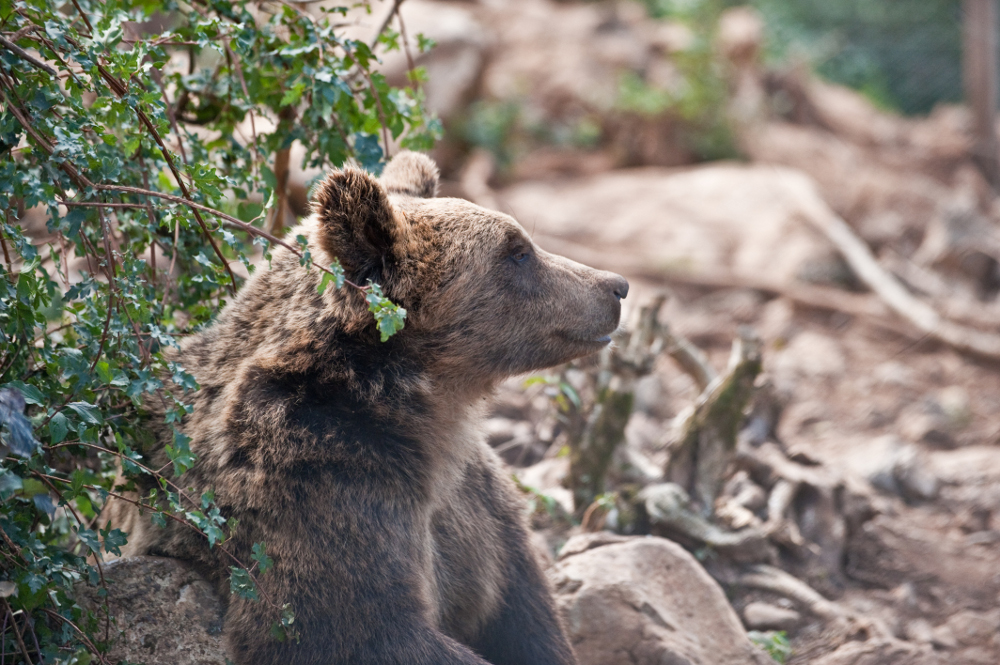
A bear at the sanctuary

== Other attractions ==
The first church in Kuterevo was built in 1707 and The Church of Our Lady of Mount Carmel was built in 1724.

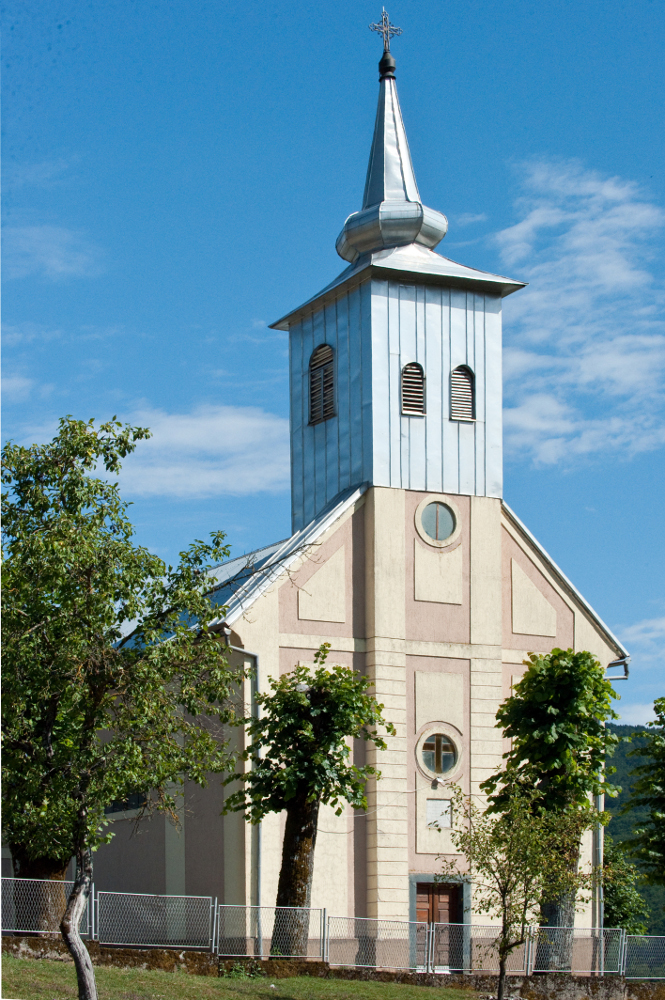
The Church of Our Lady of Mount Carmel
