= Brloška Dubrava =

- Village
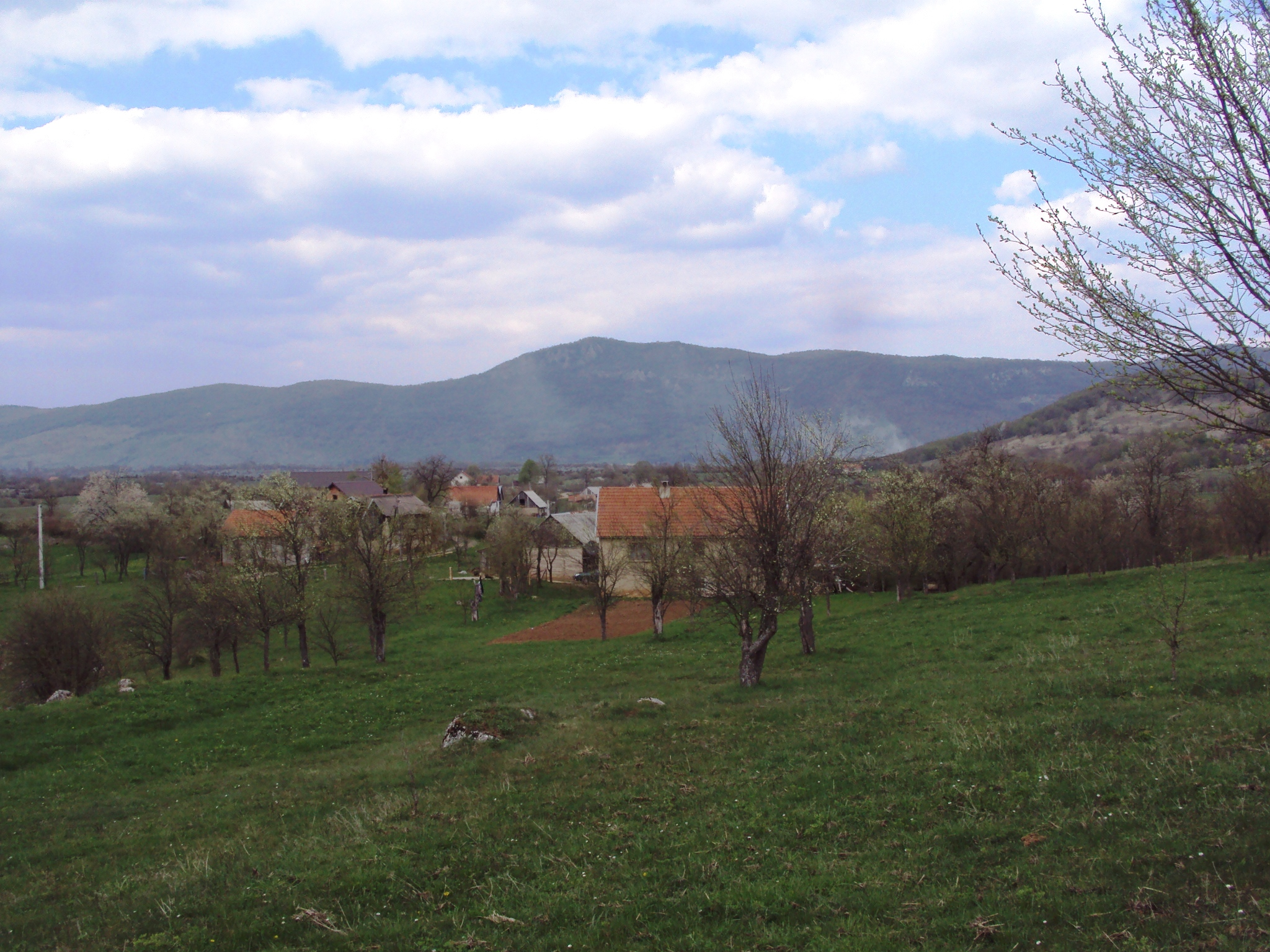

- Location within Croatia
- Coordinates: 44°54′N 15°09′E
- Country: Croatia
- County: Lika-Senj
- Municipality: Otočac

Area
  - Total: 15.0 km^{2} (5.8 sq mi)
- Elevation: 470 m (1,540 ft)

Population (2021)
  - Total: 38
  - Density: 2.5/km^{2} (6.6/sq mi)
- Time zone: UTC+1 (CET)
  - Summer (DST): UTC+2 (CEST)
- Postal code: 53220
- Area code: + (385)

Brloška Dubrava is a village in Otočac municipality in Lika-Senj County, Croatia with zip code area 53226.Brloška Dubrava . The village is settled on geographic Latitude: 44°55'53.04" and Longitude: 15°11'2.04". It has a population of 38 (as of 31 August 2021). The most known place in this area is Pećina Krču.
