= Gorići =

- Village
- Location within Croatia
- Coordinates: 44°51′05″N 15°08′39″E
- Country: Croatia
- County: Lika-Senj
- Municipality: Otočac

Area
  - Total: 4.0 km^{2} (1.5 sq mi)
- Elevation: 452 m (1,483 ft)

Population (2021)
  - Total: 11
  - Density: 2.8/km^{2} (7.1/sq mi)
- Time zone: UTC+1 (CET)
  - Summer (DST): UTC+2 (CEST)
- Postal code: 53220
- Area code: + (385)

Gorići is a village in Otočac municipality in Lika-Senj County, Croatia.
