= Hrvatsko Polje =

- Naselje
- Location within Croatia
- Coordinates: 44.907°N 15.118°E
- Country: Croatia
- County: Lika-Senj County
- Town: Otočac

Area
  - Total: 24.9 km^{2} (9.6 sq mi)

Population (2021)
  - Total: 126
  - Density: 5.06/km^{2} (13.1/sq mi)
- Time zone: UTC+1 (CET)
  - Summer (DST): UTC+2 (CEST)
- Postal code: 53222
- Area code: +385-53
- License plates: GS

Hrvatsko Polje is a village in Croatia, part of the Town of Otočac municipality.

== History ==
The name had been Vlaško Polje until it was changed after WWI to Srpsko Polje.

The name was changed from Srpsko Polje to Hrvatsko Polje on 6 October 1941 by the NDH, but the change reverted following the establishment of the SFRY.

In 1991, the name was changed from Srpsko Polje to Hrvatsko Polje.

== Demographics ==
Village of Hrvatsko Polje: Population trends 1857–2021
v

| population | 999 | 1190 | 982 | 1105 | 1174 | 1263 | 1178 | 1147 | 978 | 884 | 746 | 671 | 498 | 395 | 215 | 187 | 126 |
| | 1857 | 1869 | 1880 | 1890 | 1900 | 1910 | 1921 | 1931 | 1948 | 1953 | 1961 | 1971 | 1981 | 1991 | 2001 | 2011 | 2021 |

Note:Until 1910 known as Vlaško Polje, then from 1921 to 1991 as Srpsko Polje. Includes the population of the former village of Bjeljevina, which has been statistically independent from 1857 to 1948. Sources: Croatian Bureau of Statistics publications
