= Glavace =

Settlement in Lika-Senj County, Croatia

- Settlement
- Interactive map of Glavace
- Location of Glavace in Croatia
- Coordinates: 44°54′42″N 15°16′22″E
- Country: Croatia
- County: Lika-Senj
- City: Otočac

Area
  - Total: 26.3 km^{2} (10.2 sq mi)

Population (2021)
  - Total: 18
  - Density: 0.68/km^{2} (1.8/sq mi)
- Time zone: UTC+1 (CET)
  - Summer (DST): UTC+2 (CEST)
- Postal code: 53220 Otočac
- Area code: +385 (0)53

Glavace is a settlement in the City of Otočac in Croatia. In 2021, its population was 18.

== Demographics ==
Glavace: Population trends 1857–2021
v

population	488	555	556	684	769	676	715	650	527	507	453	357	292	289	24	30	18
	1857	1869	1880	1890	1900	1910	1921	1931	1948	1953	1961	1971	1981	1991	2001	2011	2021

Sources: Croatian Bureau of Statistics publications
