= 119th Brigade (Croatia) =

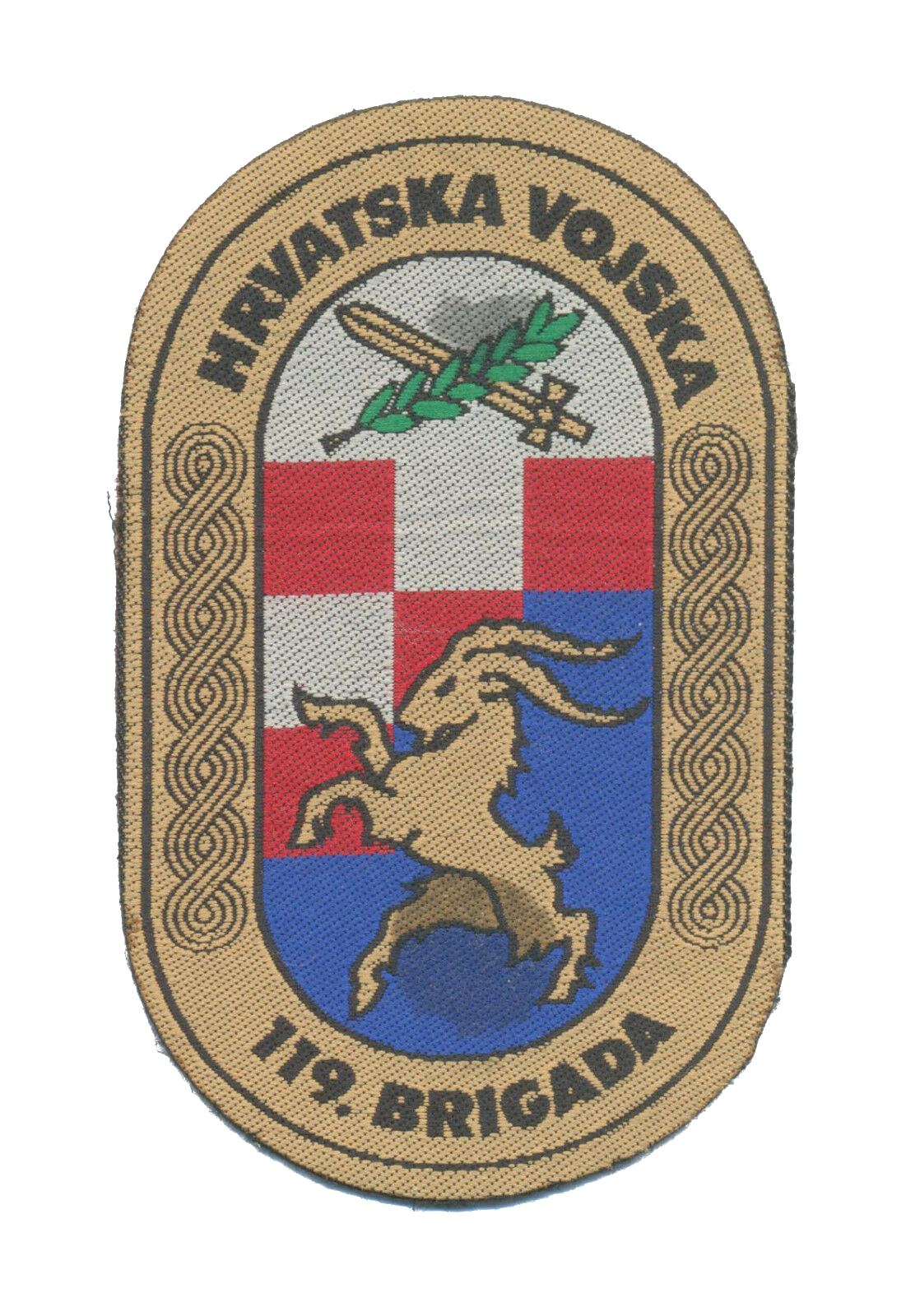
- Active: 1991 – 2004
- Country: Croatia
- Branch: Ground Army
- Type: Mechanized infantry
- Garrison/HQ: Pula
- Anniversaries: 7 September
- Engagements: Croatian War of Independence: Operation Storm

Commanders
- Brigadir: Branko Bošnjak
- Pukovnik: Mauro Ukušić

The 119th Brigade (Croatian: 119. brigada), was a Croatian Army guards brigade formed on 7 September 1991 in Pula, western Croatia, with personnel from the former Territorial Defense Brigade Joakim Rakovac. It is, together with the 1st Home Guard Battalion Pula and the 154th Brigade HV, one of the military units from Istria drafted for the Croatian War of Independence. During the Croatian War of Independence, the 119th Brigade primarily operated in the areas of Glibodol, Saborsko, Plitvice, Rakovica, Tržačka Raštela, as well as Slavonia and Dubrovnik.

The brigade originated in Istria County, which is the Croatian region that, proportionally, gave the largest number of veterans. It actively participated in Operation Oluja, and is noted for its impeccable conduct and lack of involvement in war crimes. Seven Istrians from the brigade perished in the conflict.

== History ==
The 119th Istrian Brigade of the National Guard was officially formed in Istria on September 7, 1991. The members of the brigade were from the throughout the region of Istria. It had battalions in Pula, Rovinj and Labin. With just four battalions it covered the whole of Istria: one in Umag, Pazin, and two in Pula, the 1st and the 4th. It was the first major organized military unit from Istria. More than six and a half thousand members from southern Istria joined the brigade.

The first tasks were at the end of 1991, when military facilities that were then being abandoned by the JNA were taken over. Istria did not have major war events, but it made a great contribution to the defense of the Republic of Croatia. The brigade was involved in demining the airport of Pula after the latter was evacuated by the JNA in November 1991, about a month before the attack on Vrsar. Two members of the brigade and two members of the Ministry of the Interior (Dušan Bulešić, Stevo Grbić, Vicalj Marjanović and Marijan Vinković) died in the process. The 119th Brigade spent most of the war on the Lika battlefield. Some platoons were also in Slavonia and around Dubrovnik. In the summer of 1992, many of its members were demobilized and later joined other units of the Croatian Army. In 1994, members were mobilized again, and the brigade was engaged in the Lika area. In Lika, the brigade also participated in the Operation Storm, operating in the direction Glibodol - Saborsko - Plitvice - Rakovica - Tržačka Raštela. The brigade did not leave a single stain on its conduct during the war.

From 2001 to 2004, the unit was integrated with the boškarini of the 154th Brigade HV.

At the session of the Istrian County Assembly on March 14, 2016, a unanimous decision was made to award the Istrian County Emblem to the 119th Brigade. The award was presented at a solemn session of the Istrian County Assembly by Valter Flego on the occasion of the Day of the Istrian County Statute on March 30, 2016.

== See also ==
- Operation Storm
- 1st Home Guard Battalion Pula
- 154th Brigade HV
