= Švica =

- Village
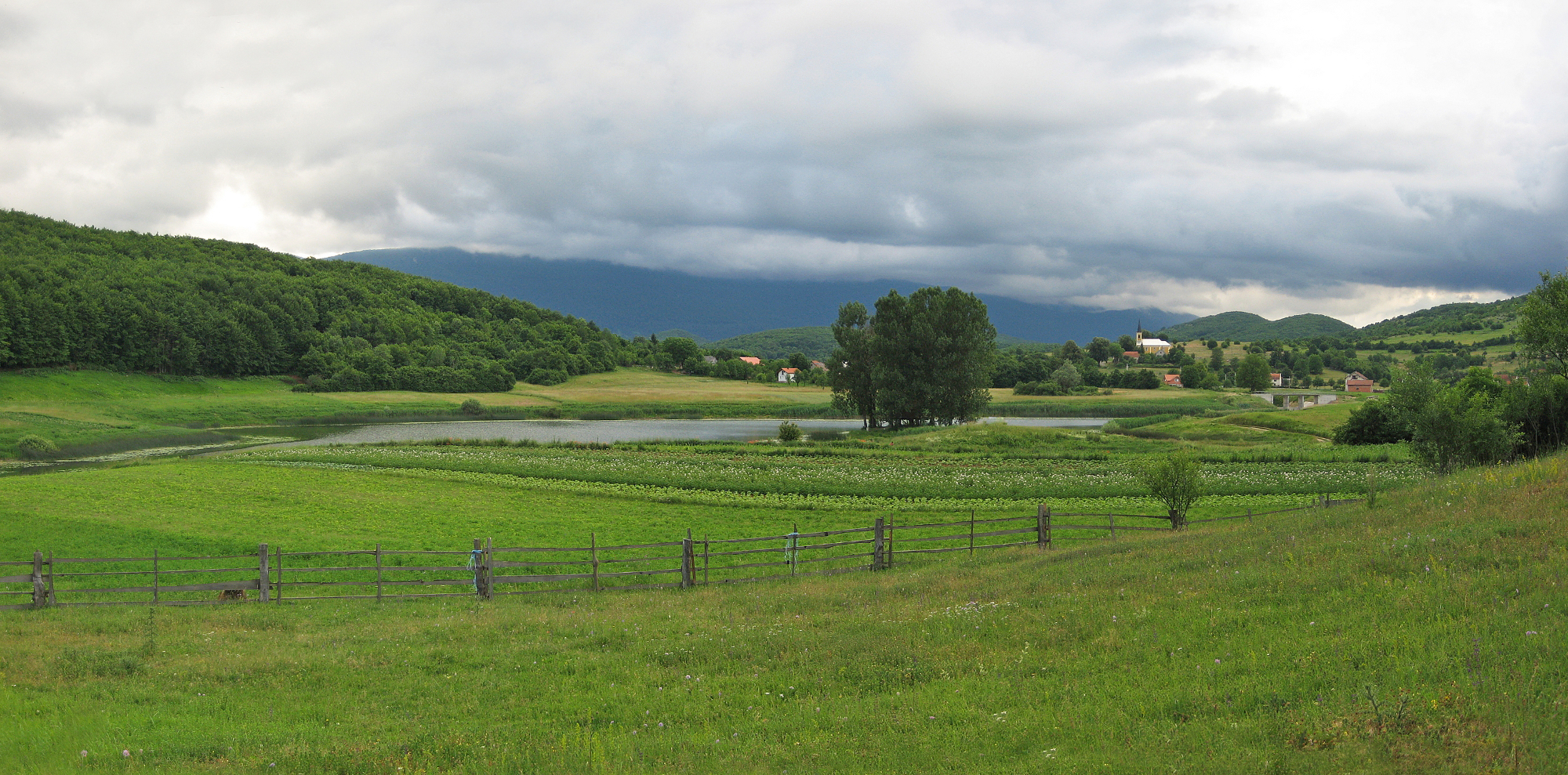

- Location within Croatia
- Coordinates: 44°52′16″N 15°10′30″E
- Country: Croatia
- County: Lika-Senj
- Municipality: Otočac

Area
  - Total: 14.1 km^{2} (5.4 sq mi)
- Elevation: 451 m (1,480 ft)

Population (2021)
  - Total: 311
  - Density: 22.1/km^{2} (57.1/sq mi)
- Time zone: UTC+1 (CET)
  - Summer (DST): UTC+2 (CEST)
- Postal code: 53220
- Area code: + (385)

Švica is a village in Otočac municipality in Lika-Senj County, Croatia.

== Demographics ==
Historical population

Year	Pop.	±%
1857	974	—
1869	791	−18.8%
1880	871	+10.1%
1890	858	−1.5%
1900	987	+15.0%
1910	1,051	+6.5%
1921	1,048	−0.3%
1931	1,074	+2.5%

Year	Pop.	±%
1948	1,056	−1.7%
1953	908	−14.0%
1961	637	−29.8%
1971	604	−5.2%
1981	513	−15.1%
1991	558	+8.8%
2001	526	−5.7%
