= Territorial Defense Brigade Joakim Rakovac =

- Croatian: Brigade teritorijalne obrane »Joakim Rakovac«j
- Country: Yugoslavia
- Branch: Territorial Defence Force
- Type: Light infantry
- Garrison/HQ: Istria

The Territorial Defense Brigade Joakim Rakovac was a military unit of the Yugoslavian Territorial Defence Force of the Yugoslav Armed Forces. The brigade was based in Istria, now Croatia. During the Croatian War of Independence, personnel from the unit was used to create the HV 119th Brigade.
