= Prozor, Croatia =

Prozor
- Naselje
- Interactive map of Prozor
- Location of Prozor in Croatia
- Coordinates: 44°50′55″N 15°16′7″E
- Country: Croatia
- County: Lika-Senj County
- Town: Otočac

Area
  - Total: 32.1 km^{2} (12.4 sq mi)

Population (2021)
  - Total: 830
  - Density: 26/km^{2} (67/sq mi)
- Time zone: UTC+1 (CET)
  - Summer (DST): UTC+2 (CEST)
- Postal code: 53220
- Area code: +385-53
- Vehicle registration: GS

Prozor is a settlement (naselje) in the valley of river Gacka in Croatia, just south of Otočac and a part of the Town of Otočac municipality.

It is the site of the ancient Iapodian and Roman settlement of Arupium.
