= Stojan Aralica =

Serbian academic and impressionist painter

Stojan Aralica (24 December 1883 – 4 February 1980) was a Serbian Impressionist painter and academic.

== Biography ==
Stojan Aralica was born in Škare, Lika, and his life can be followed through his studies in Munich (1909–1914), a brief stay in Prague, advanced studies in École nationale supérieure des Beaux-Arts in Paris, then period in Zagreb and his final move to Belgrade in 1941. He remained in Belgrade for the rest of his life, with the exception of his stay in Stockholm from 1946 to 1948. In the same way, as we can differentiate between the stages of his life, we can distinguish four clearly distinct periods in his painting opus: the Munich, Prague, Paris, Zagreb, and Belgrade periods. During his education in Munich portraits and nudes prevailed thematically, and were in a form close to academism and the late echoes of the Secession. The brief domination of form over color (1922–1925) was replaced by a period of artistic maturing, beginning with his arrival in Paris (1926). Joining the active local artistic mainstream, he turned away from the decorative and towards pursuing a purely visual interest. His formerly emphasized full-volume form was slowly disintegrating into colored surfaces. This significant turning point began with small nudes and still lifes painted in the studio of André Lhote, and the coloristic organization of his paintings was developed on the landscapes around the countryside Malakoff, Casisse and especially St. Tropez. The necessary refinement ended in the next, the Zagreb period (1933–1941) when Aralica rejoined the current trends in his home country. His technique, which was close to that of fauvists, is particularly prominent in his seaside landscapes from Dubrovnik, Orebić, Korčula. Finally, the Belgrade period, especially between 1951 and 1959, can be considered as his creative zenith. By painting lyrical atmospheres with broad and layered impastos on a series of landscapes from Rovinj, Belgrade and more often Lika, he departed from the confines of intimistic painting, only to develop it to a monumental whole of universal significance. Although Aralica's work was always in touch with current trends of European art, in a narrower sense it still belonged to the same climes as that of domestic coloristic painters, whose art drew its strength and inspiration from their own, native soil. He contributed to the further development of contemporary art in the second half of the twentieth century with a series of significant works painted in the years after World War II.
