= Gacko Polje =

Karstic field in Croatia

- Location within Croatia
- Floor elevation: 425–481 m (1,394–1,578 ft)
- Area: 80 km^{2} (31 mi^{2})

Geography
- Country: Croatia
- State/Province: Lika-Senj County
- Population center: Otočac
- Coordinates: 44.85°N 15.30°E
- Mountain range: Dinaric Alps
- Rivers: Gacka
- Interactive map of Gacko Polje

Gacko Polje (lit. 'Field of Gacka') is a polje (karstic field) in the Lika region of Croatia, the third largest in Croatia, covering an area of 80 square kilometres (31 sq mi).
