= Male Kompolje =

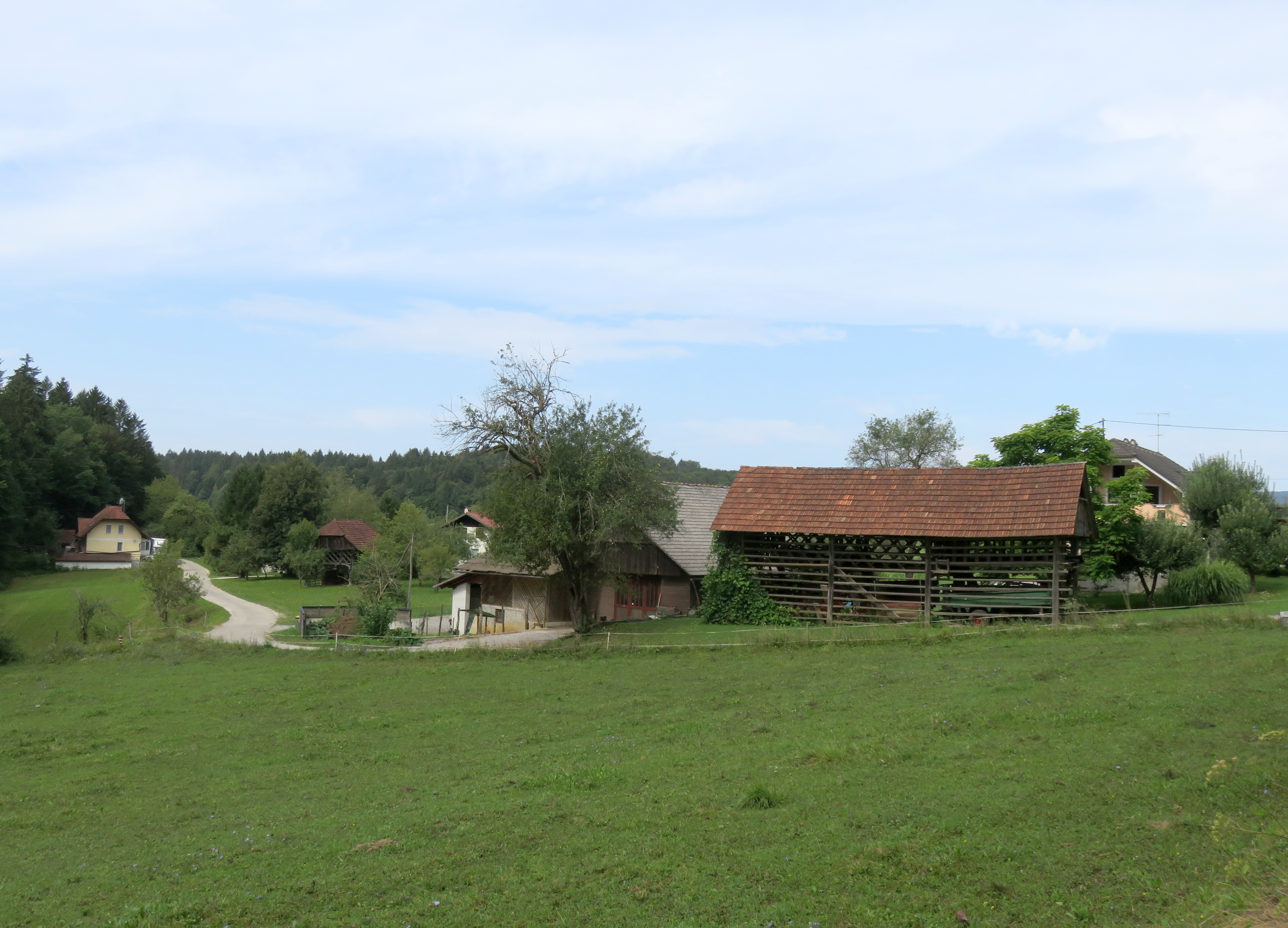

- Location in Slovenia
- Coordinates: 45°54′4.19″N 14°49′39.65″E
- Country: Slovenia
- Traditional region: Lower Carniola
- Statistical region: Central Slovenia
- Municipality: Ivančna Gorica

Area
  - Total: 1.2 km^{2} (0.46 sq mi)
- Elevation: 318.2 m (1,044 ft)

Population (2002)
  - Total: 23

Male Kompolje (pronounced [ˈmaːlɛ ˈkoːmpɔljɛ]; German: Kleinkumpale) is a small settlement east of Muljava in the Municipality of Ivančna Gorica in central Slovenia. The area is part of the historical region of Lower Carniola and is now included in the Central Slovenia Statistical Region.
