= Velike Kompolje =

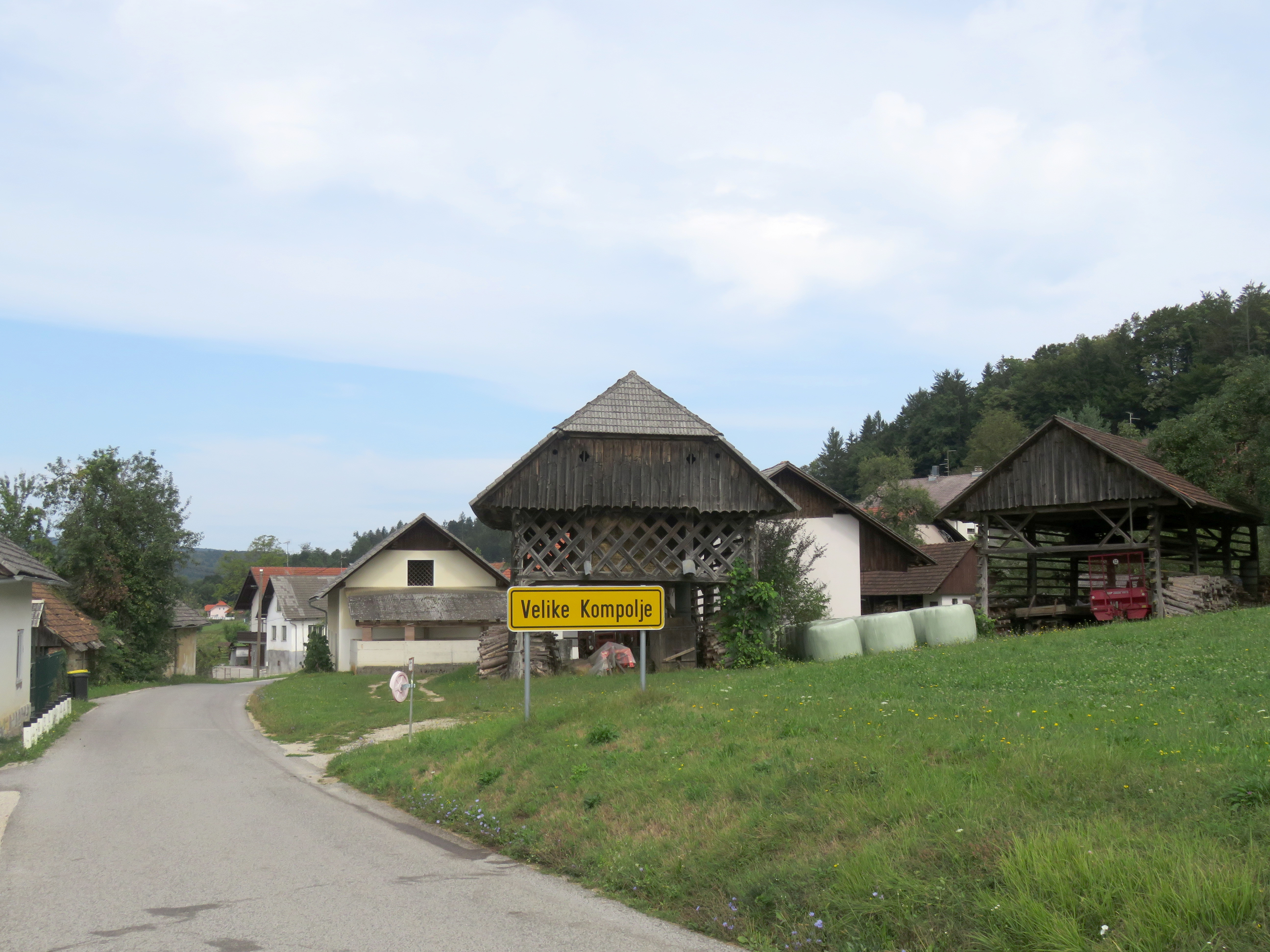

- Location in Slovenia
- Coordinates: 45°54′16.14″N 14°49′16.88″E
- Country: Slovenia
- Traditional region: Lower Carniola
- Statistical region: Central Slovenia
- Municipality: Ivančna Gorica

Area
  - Total: 0.82 km^{2} (0.32 sq mi)
- Elevation: 316.7 m (1,039 ft)

Population (2002)
  - Total: 40

Velike Kompolje (pronounced [ˈʋeːlikɛ ˈkoːmpɔljɛ]; German: Großkumpale) is a settlement east of Muljava in the Municipality of Ivančna Gorica in central Slovenia. The area is part of the historical region of Lower Carniola. The municipality is now included in the Central Slovenia Statistical Region.

A roadside chapel-shrine in the centre of the settlement was built in the early 20th century. It contains a statue of the Virgin Mary.
