= Kompolje, Otočac =

Kompolje
- Village
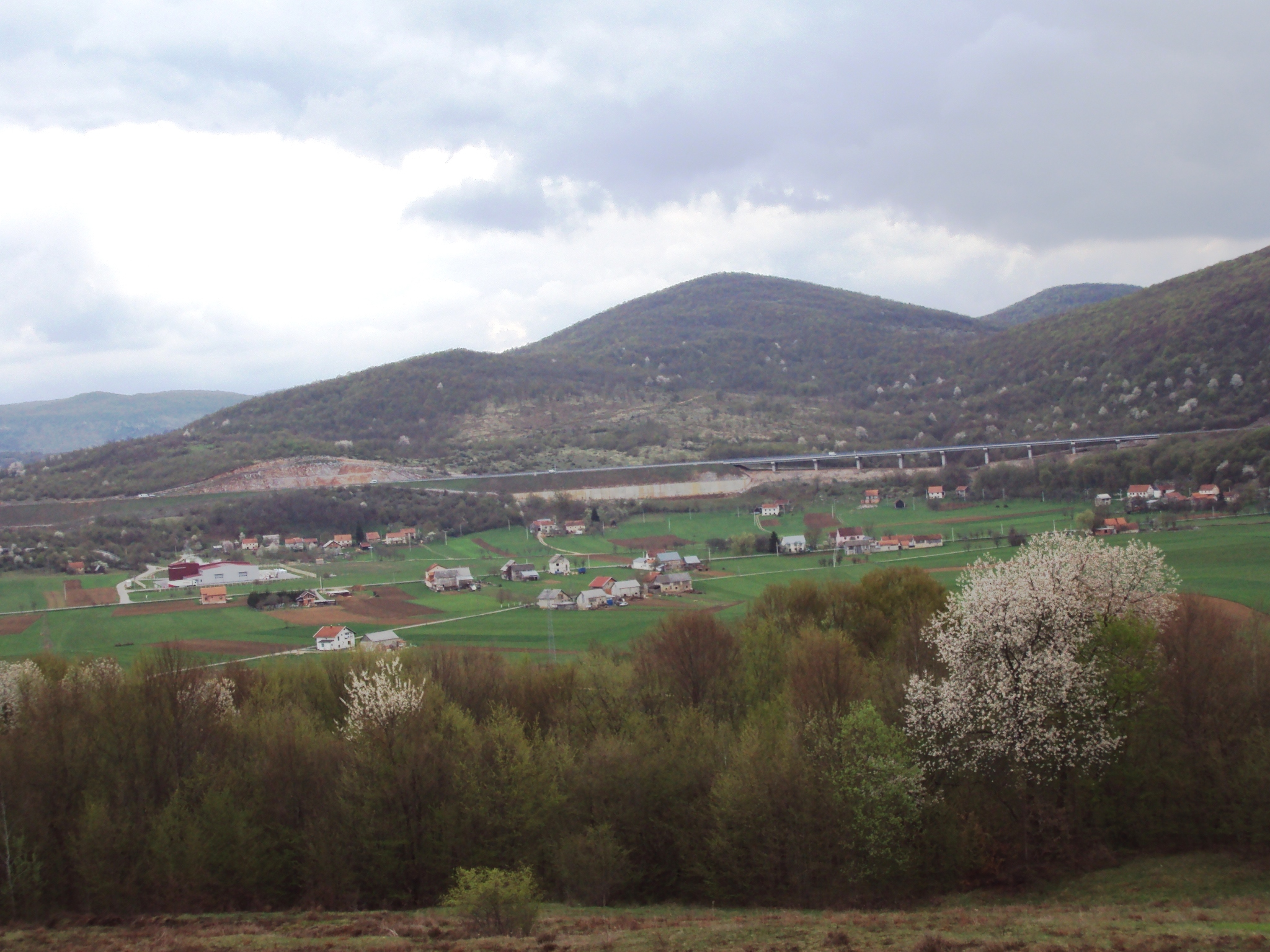
- Interactive map of Kompolje
- Location within Croatia
- Coordinates: 44°55′17″N 15°08′42″E
- Country: Croatia
- County: Lika-Senj
- Municipality: Otočac

Area
  - Total: 13.5 km^{2} (5.2 sq mi)
- Elevation: 425 m (1,394 ft)

Population (2021)
  - Total: 299
  - Density: 22.1/km^{2} (57.4/sq mi)
- Time zone: UTC+1 (CET)
  - Summer (DST): UTC+2 (CEST)
- Postal code: 53220
- Area code: + (385)

Kompolje is a village in Otočac municipality in Lika-Senj County, Croatia.
