= Ramljani =

Settlement in Lika-Senj County, Croatia

- Settlement
- Interactive map of Ramljani
- Location of Ramljani in Croatia
- Coordinates: 44°45′54″N 15°24′43″E
- Country: Croatia
- County: Lika-Senj
- City: Otočac

Area
  - Total: 36.6 km^{2} (14.1 sq mi)

Population (2021)
  - Total: 69
  - Density: 1.9/km^{2} (4.9/sq mi)
- Time zone: UTC+1 (CET)
  - Summer (DST): UTC+2 (CEST)
- Postal code: 53220 Otočac

Ramljani is a settlement in the City of Otočac in Croatia. In 2021, its population was 69.

== History ==
On 27 March 2022 at 17:20 the ŽVOC Gospić received a call about a wildfire in the area. 9 hectares (22 acres) burned by the time it was put out at 18:55 by DVD Sinac.

== Demographics ==
Ramljani: Population trends 1857–2021
v

population	864	766	837	891	1043	1096	1134	1088	998	902	777	637	499	368	212	167	69
	1857	1869	1880	1890	1900	1910	1921	1931	1948	1953	1961	1971	1981	1991	2001	2011	2021

Sources: Croatian Bureau of Statistics publications
