= Otočac =

- Town
- Grad Otočac; Town of Otočac
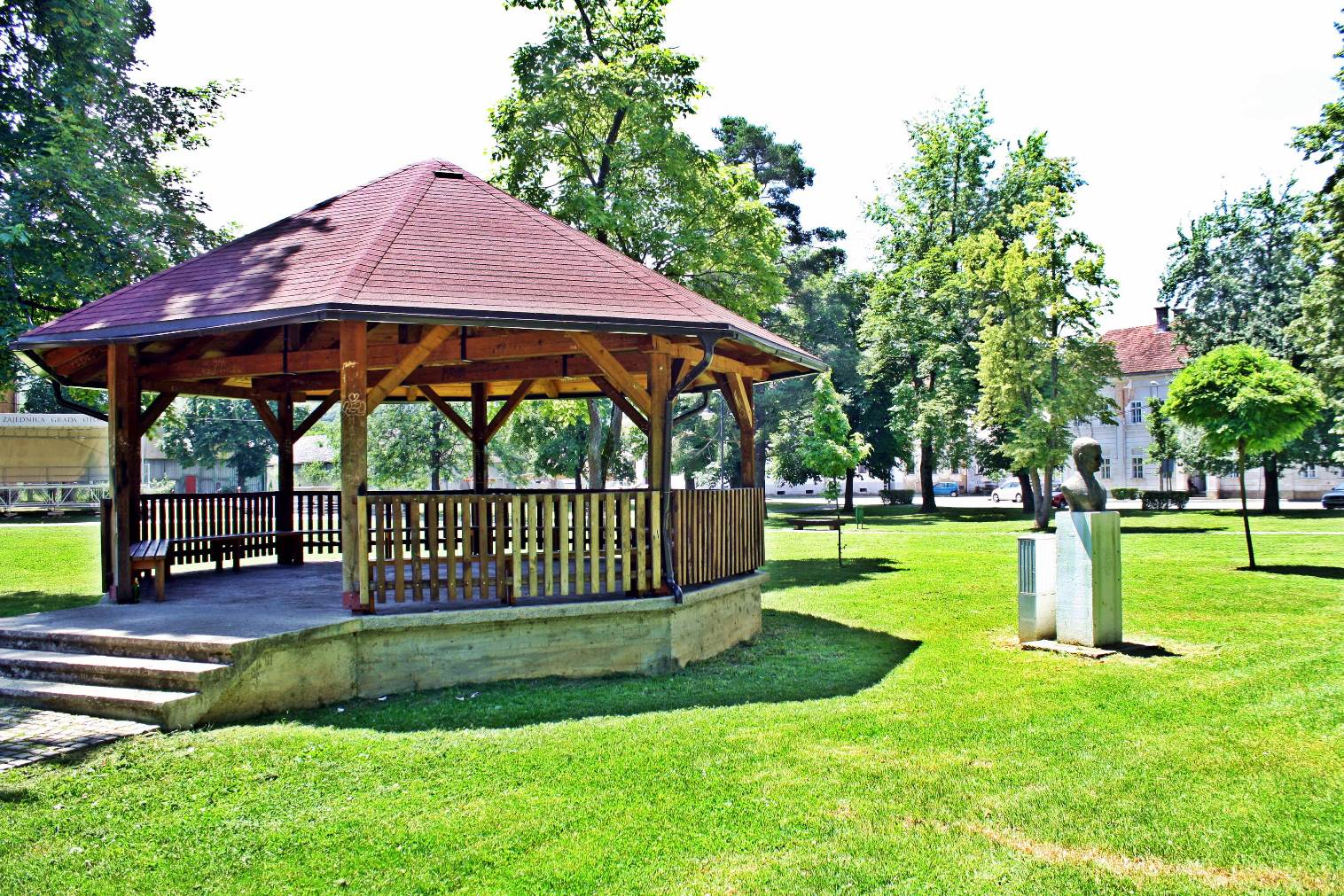
- Park in Otočac

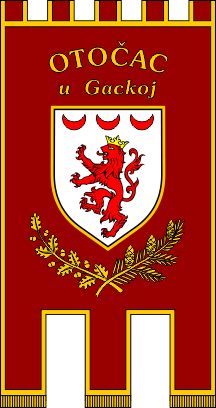
- Flag
- Interactive map of Otočac
- Location of Otočac within Croatia
- Coordinates: 44°52′N 15°14′E
- Country: Croatia
- Region: Mountainous Croatia (Lika, Gacka)
- County: Lika-Senj County

Government
  - Mayor: Goran Bukovac (Independent)

Area
  - Town: 565.0 km^{2} (218.1 sq mi)
  - Urban: 21.5 km^{2} (8.3 sq mi)

Population (2021)
  - Town: 8,332
  - Density: 14.75/km^{2} (38.19/sq mi)
  - Urban: 3,852
  - Urban density: 179/km^{2} (464/sq mi)
- Time zone: UTC+1 (CET)
  - Summer (DST): UTC+2 (CEST)
- Postal code: 53220
- Area code: 053
- Website: otocac.hr

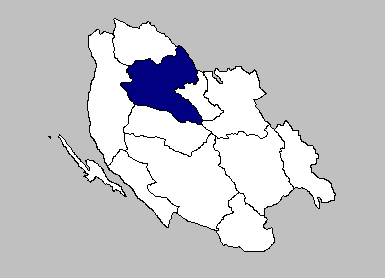
Town of Otočac within the Lika-Senj County

Otočac (pronounced [ɔtɔ̌tʃats]) is a town in Croatia, former bishopric and present Latin Catholic titular see. It lies in the northwestern part of Lika region, in the Gacka river valley. The population of the administrative area of the town of Otočac was 9,778 in 2011, with 4,240 in Otočac itself, the majority of whom were Croats (91%).

== Name ==
The town Otočac (meaning "small island", surrounded by Gacka River) is known as Otocsán in Hungarian, Ottocio in Italian, and Ottocium in Latin. In historical sources, the name has been rendered as Ottochaz (German and English), Ottocaz (Italian and German), and Ottotschaz, Ottotschan, & Ottocsaz (German).

== History ==
Otočac was named after the early Croatian parish. The text of the famous Baška Tablet (around 1100) says that the church of St. Nicholas in Otočac was part of the order community with the Church of St. Lucy, Jurandvor on the island of Krk. From 1300 on, it belonged to the estate of the Frankopan family. Sigismund Frankopan (1461–1535) founded a diocese there (see below). The settlement with a defence tower, at a bend in the river Gacka, was protected by a towered fort. The Otočac area was the scene of many battles with the Ottoman Turks, and the impregnability of the city and its importance for the defense of Croatian territory became increasingly significant. One of the major battles was the battle of 1543 in which Croatian forces defeated the Ottoman invaders and prevented them from capturing the city and advancing further west.

After the Otočac fort's demolition in 1829, only parts of it remained preserved. To provide a safer defence, a Renaissance-era fortress ("Fortica") was built in 1619, with a triangular layout of cylindrical towers.

The Baroque parish church of the Holy Trinity, erected in 1684 (restored in 1774), is a large one-nave building with rounded sanctuary; three side chapels are on each side of the nave. The bell tower rises from the main front. The late baroque and classicist furnishings of the church include seven altars, a pulpit, baptismal font and sepulchral slabs from the 18th century.

In the 16th century, Otočac became a part of the Austrian Military Frontier, with its own Otočac Capitanate. Its known captains include:

1. Franjo Mudrovčić (1540), burgrave
2. Andrija Tadiolović (1550), burgrave
  Vinko Lacković
3. Tomo Čadež (1579)
4. Gašpar Wotschar (1580)
5. vojvoda Malagrudić (1581)
6. Jeršan Slavić (1586), burgrave
7. Warkin (1587)
8. Premb (1589)
9. vojvoda Smoljan (1590)
  Grga Slavić
10. Gašpar Radić (1591)
  Nikola Tadiolović, burgrave
11. Marko Šimatović (1592)
  Ivan Rupčić, upravitelj
12. Antun Mikulanić (1600)
13. Juraj Aichelburg (1606)
14. Januš Semenić (1608)
15. Ernst von Paradeiser (1620)
16. Andrija Semenić (1629)
17. Gašpar Starešinić (1630)
18. Vicko Hreljanović (1632)
19. Karlo Panizol (1636)
  Petar Gračanin, in absentia
20. Jakov Portner (1636, †1645)
21. Hans Ludwig Gall von Gallenstein (1645)
22. Gašpar Lazarin (1647–1648)
23. Andrija Gusić (1649)
24. Jobst Josip Portner (1658, †1661)
25. Andre Bernardin od Oberburga (1661, †1673)
26. Georg Sigismund von Paradeiser (1673, †1673)
27. Bernhard Leo Gall von Gallenstein (1675, †1689)
28. Ivan Vilim Kušljan (1689)
29. Tomo Strakhan (1691)
30. Jakov Strassoldo (1714)
31. Hans Lorenz von Paradeiser (1717)
32. Graf Saurau (1723, †1726)
33. Georg von Herberstein (1726–1735)

From 1746, Otočac was the headquarters of a regiment (Ottotschaner Grenz-Infanterie Regiment N°II) of the Croatian Military Frontier, (Croatian Vojna Krajina). A number of harmonious, simple, mostly two-storey houses originate from this period. Until 1918, Otočac was part of the Austrian monarchy (part of the Kingdom of Croatia-Slavonia subordinate to the Kingdom of Hungary after the compromise of 1867). In the late 19th century and early 20th century, Otočac was part of the Lika-Krbava County of Croatia-Slavonia.

During the World War II Genocide of Serbs by the Ustaše, Otočac was the site of the slaughter of some 331 Serbs in late April 1941. The victims were forced to dig their own graves before being hacked to death with axes. Among the victims was the local Orthodox priest and his son. The former was made to recite prayers for the dying as his son was killed. The priest was then tortured, his hair and beard was pulled out, eyes gouged out before he was skinned alive.

During the Croatian War of Independence some surrounding areas of the city were occupied by Serbian forces, but were later liberated by the Croats. It was later defended by the boškarini of the 154th Brigade HV, which in the following years visited the city. An armistice agreement was signed in January 1992, but the surroundings of Otočac were finally liberated only in 1995.

== Ecclesiastical History ==
A bishopric was established in 1460, on territory split from the Roman Catholic Diocese of Senj, which local estate owner Sigismund Frankopan (1461–1535) founded at the church of St. Nicholas and Jelena (née Keglević), widow of Juraj Mikuličić, who was a member of the community of the Divine Holy Spirit in Rome, gave to the church three parcels of land. Initially it was suffragan of the Metropolitan Archdiocese of Salona, later of the Archdiocese of Split. In 1534 it was suppressed and its territory returned to its mother diocese of Senj.

It was nominally restored in 1933 as a Latin titular bishopric.

== Demographics ==
In the 2011 census, the Town of Otočac had a total of 9,778 inhabitants. By ethnicity, 91.18% were Croats and 7.25% were Serbs. Croats in the vicinity of Otočac form two groups, those who speak Chakavian dialect and Bunjevci, who speak Shtokavian dialect with an Ikavian accent. Serbs form a majority in the villages of Gorići and Staro Selo. The settlement of Otočac itself had population of 4,240.

Before the Croatian War of Independence, the 1991 census lists the greater municipality of Otočac as having 24,992 inhabitants, with 16,355 Croats (65.44%) and 7,781 Serbs (31.13%).

Town of Otočac: Population trends 1857–2021
v

population	21304	21878	22144	23841	27177	26826	26301	25634	22899	21096	19230	18310	16715	16113	10411	9778	8332
	1857	1869	1880	1890	1900	1910	1921	1931	1948	1953	1961	1971	1981	1991	2001	2011	2021

Sources: Croatian Bureau of Statistics publications

== Politics ==
=== Minority councils and representatives ===
Directly elected minority councils and representatives are tasked with consulting tasks for the local or regional authorities in which they are advocating for minority rights and interests, integration into public life and participation in the management of local affairs. At the 2023 Croatian national minorities councils and representatives elections Serbs of Croatia fulfilled legal requirements to elect 15 members minority council of the Town of Otočac with only 13 members being elected in the end.

== Geography ==
Otočac is located in the western part of Gacko Polje, the karst field of centrally located Gacka river, located between Velebit and Mala Kapela, at an elevation of 459m. The town lies to the southeast of Senj, northwest of Gospić and west of Plitvice.

There are two town sections, the Upper Town and Lower Town.

=== Settlements ===
The following settlements comprise the municipality (population as of 2021):

- Brlog, population 256 ▼
- Brloška Dubrava, population 38 ▼
- Čovići, population 520 ▼
- Dabar, population 59 ▼
- Doljani, population 75 ▼
- Drenov Klanac, population 31 ▼
- Glavace, population 18 ▼
- Gorići, population 11 ▼
- Hrvatsko Polje, population 126 ▼
- Kompolje, population 299 ▼
- Kuterevo, population 385 ▼
- Ličko Lešće, population 571 ▼
- Lipovlje, population 158 ▼
- Otočac, population 3852 ▼
- Podum, population 128 ▲
- Ponori, population 42 ▼
- Prozor, population 830 ▼
- Ramljani, population 69 ▼
- Sinac, population 489 ▼
- Staro Selo, population 28 ▼
- Škare, population 36
- Švica, population 311 ▼

== Climate ==
Since records began in 1994, the highest temperature recorded at the local weather station was 39.0 °C (102.2 °F), on 4 August 2017. The coldest temperature was −30.1 °C (−22.2 °F), on 13 January 2003.

== Sports ==
The local chapter of the HPS is HPD "Mali Rajinac", which had 24 members in 1936 under the Fran Častek presidency. Membership fell to 22 in 1937.

== Gallery ==
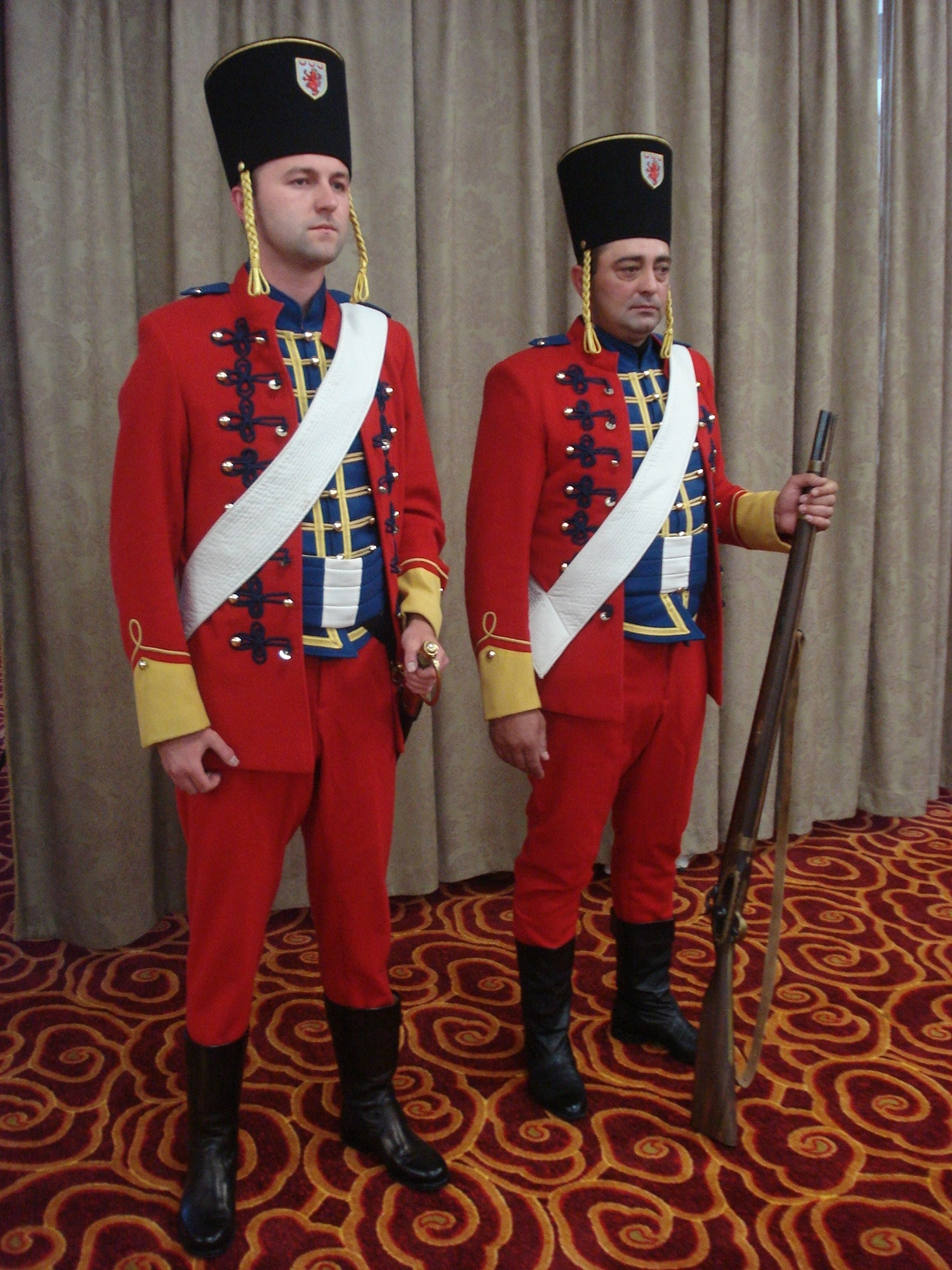
Guards wearing a traditional Lika uniform of the Military Frontier

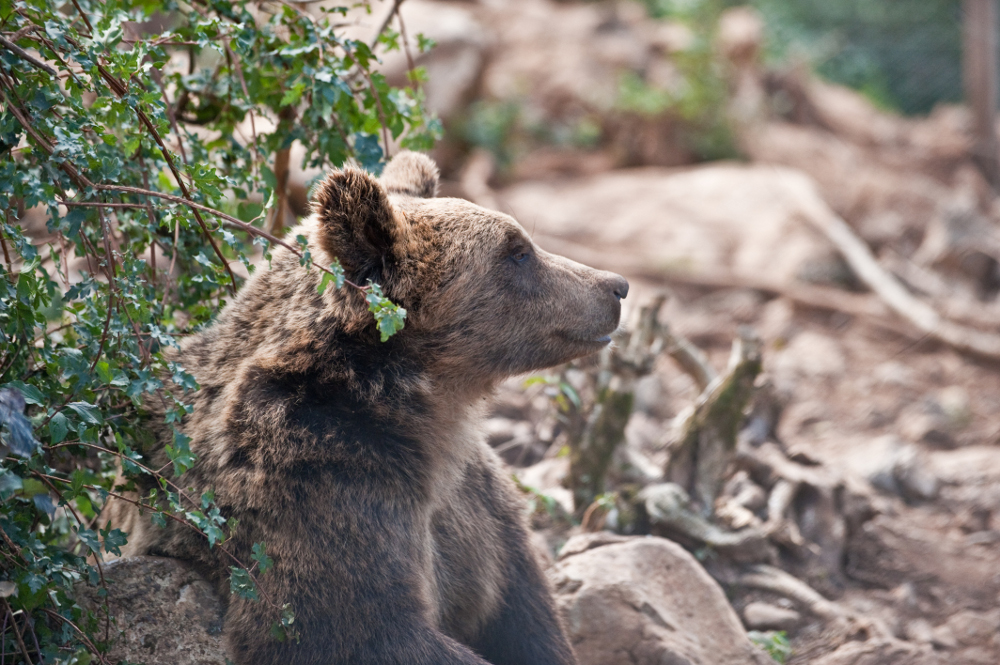
Brown bear at the Kuterevo bear sanctuary

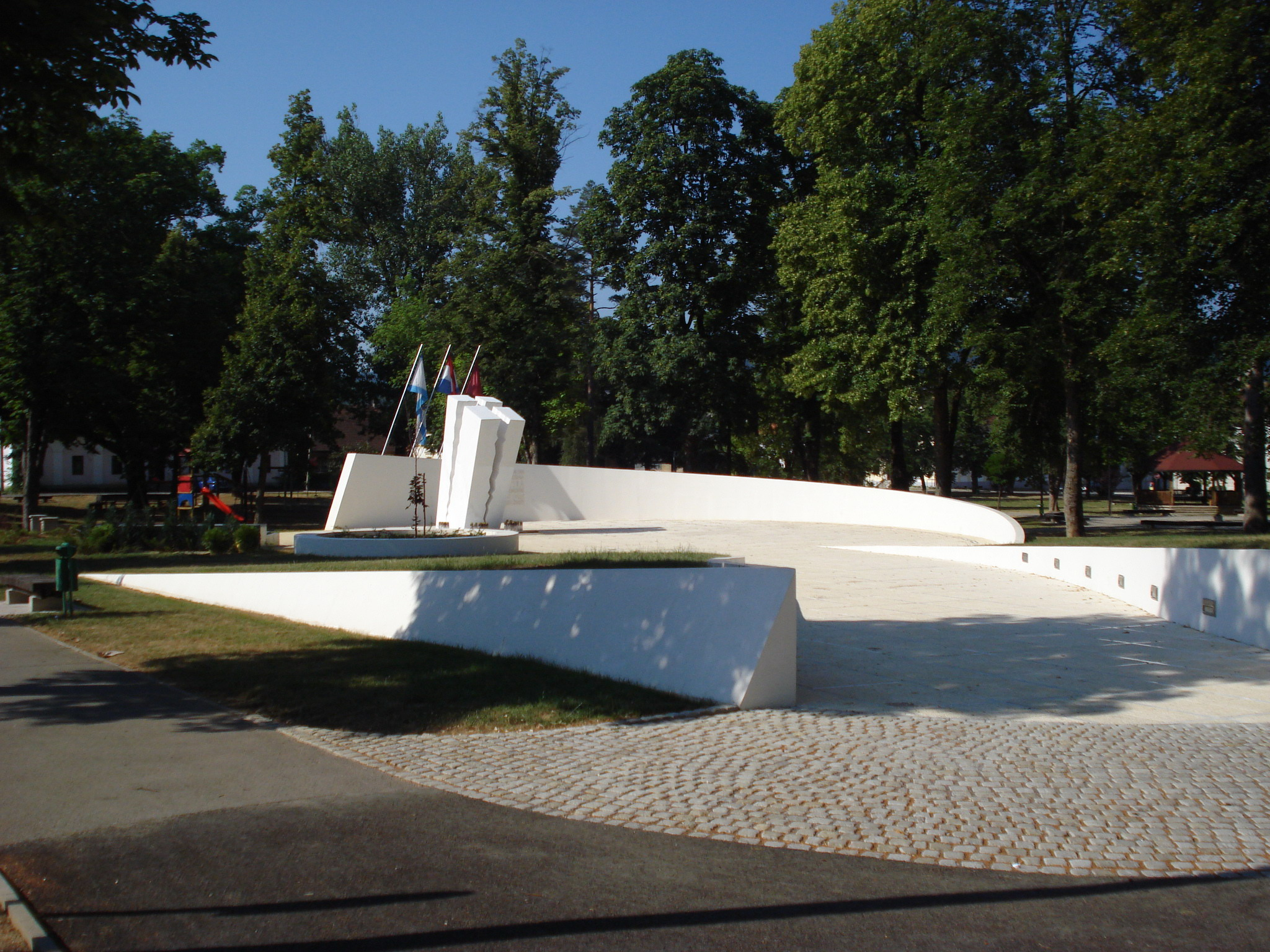
Memorial to fallen Croatian defenders of the Croatian War of Independence

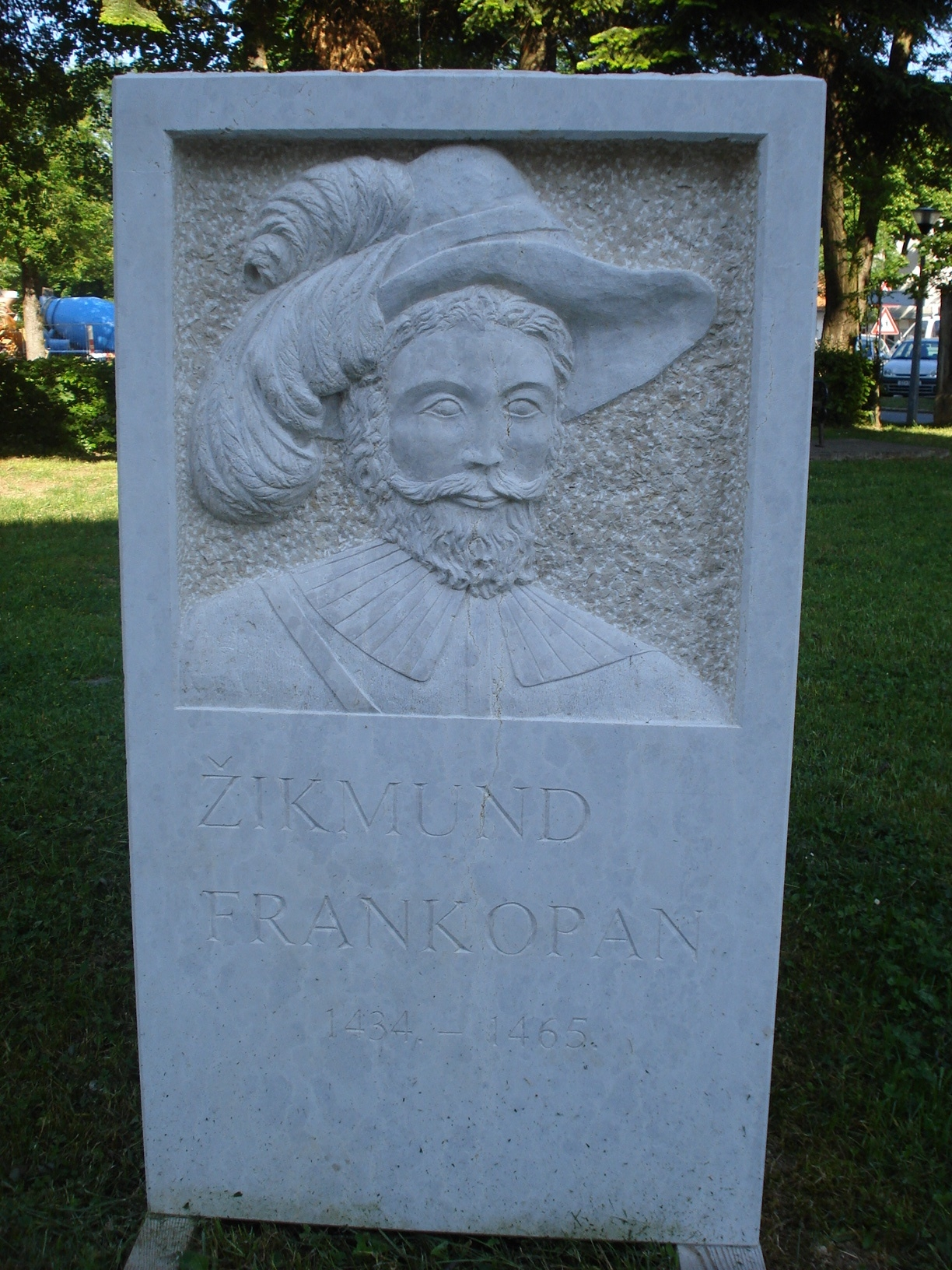
Monument of Žikmund (Sigismund) Frankopan, Lord of the town in the 15th century

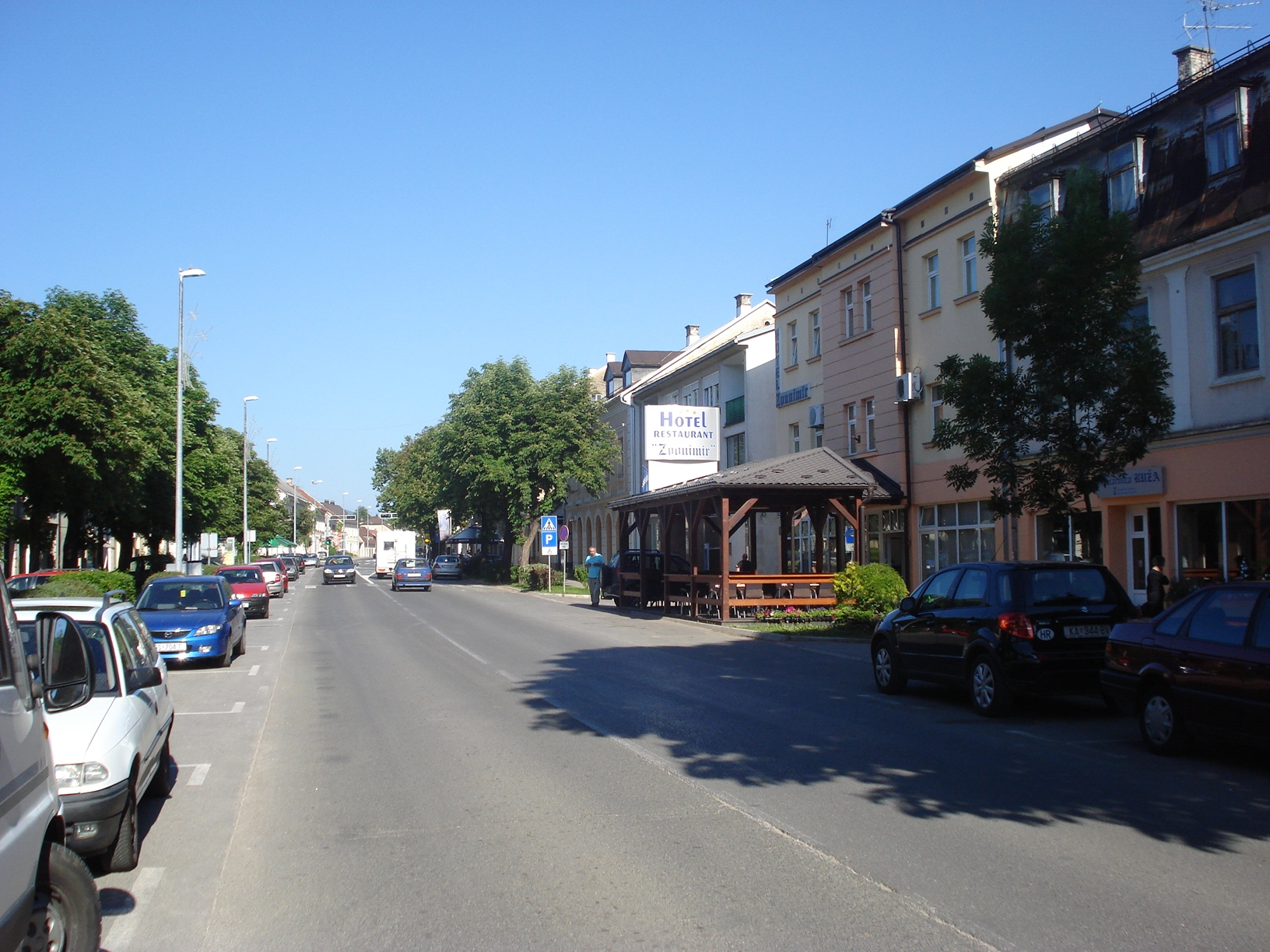
King Zvonimir Street

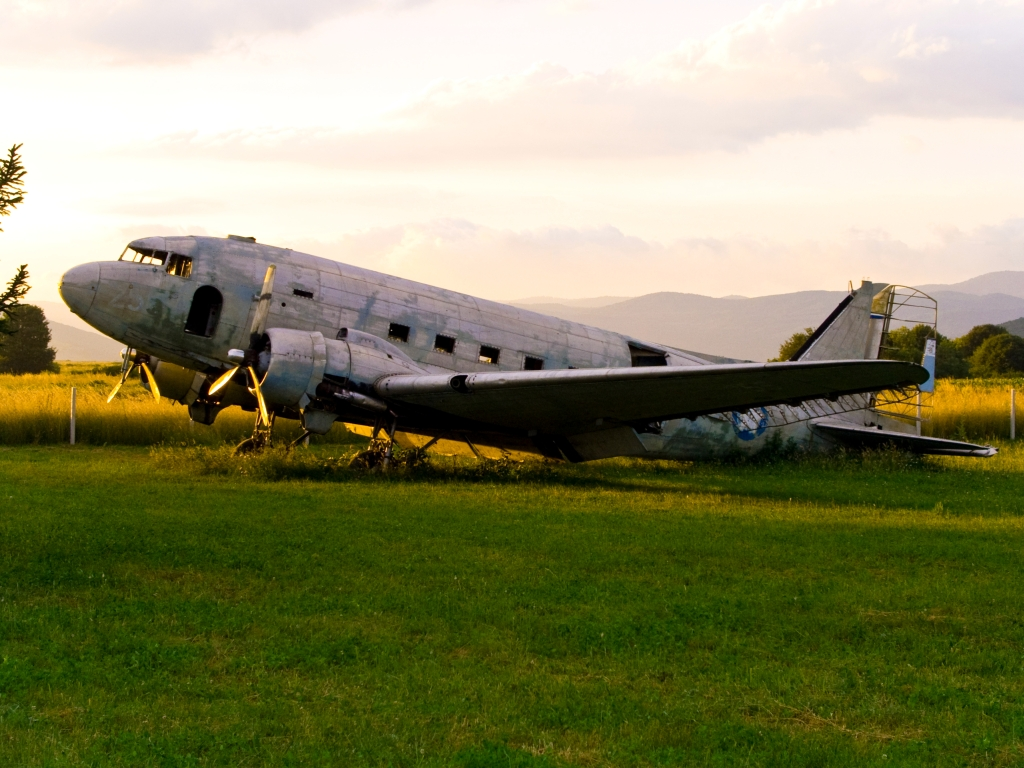
Otočac airfield

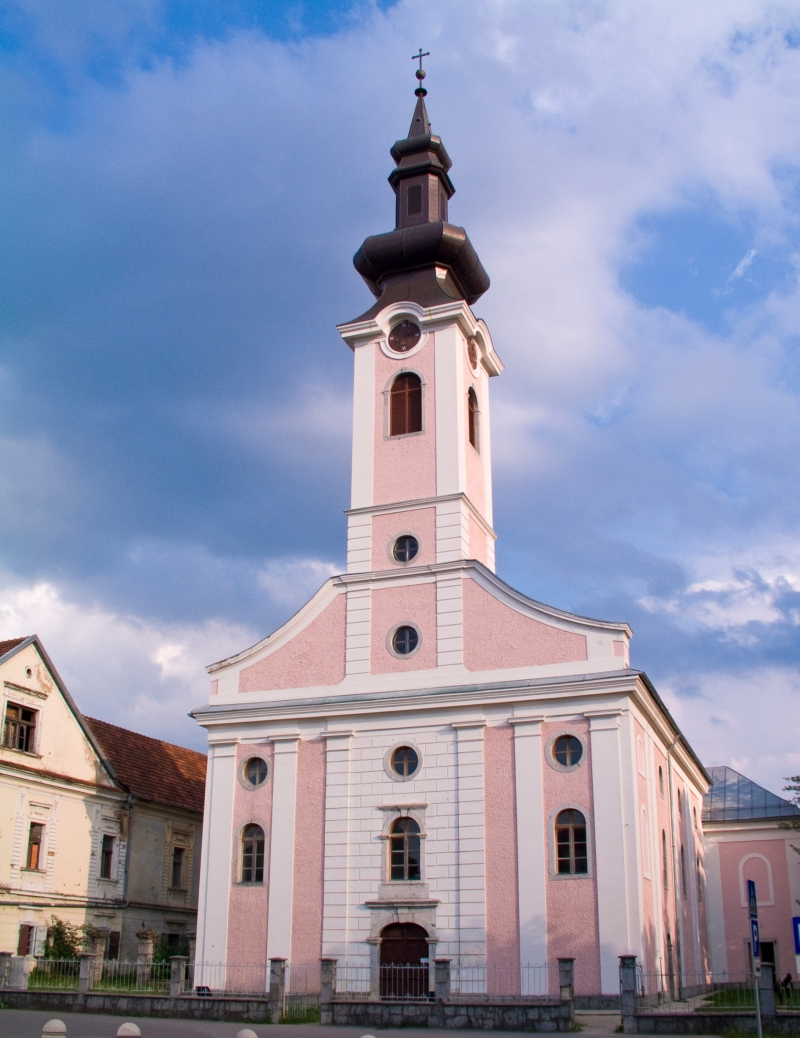
Holy Trinity Church

== Notable natives and residents ==
- Jure Francetić
- Stjepan Sarkotić
- Juraj Rukavina Vidovgradski (Austrian general)
- Stjepan Jovanović
- Božidar Maljković
- Julius Rajkovic
- Zoran Levnaić
- Slobodan Ljubotina
- Vladimir Varićak
- Ivan Rukavina

== See also ==
- List of Catholic dioceses in Croatia
- Fortica Fortress in Otočac

== Sources and external links ==
- Official website
- GCatholic
