= Gacka =

River in Croatia

Coordinates: 44°53′53″N 15°06′07″E

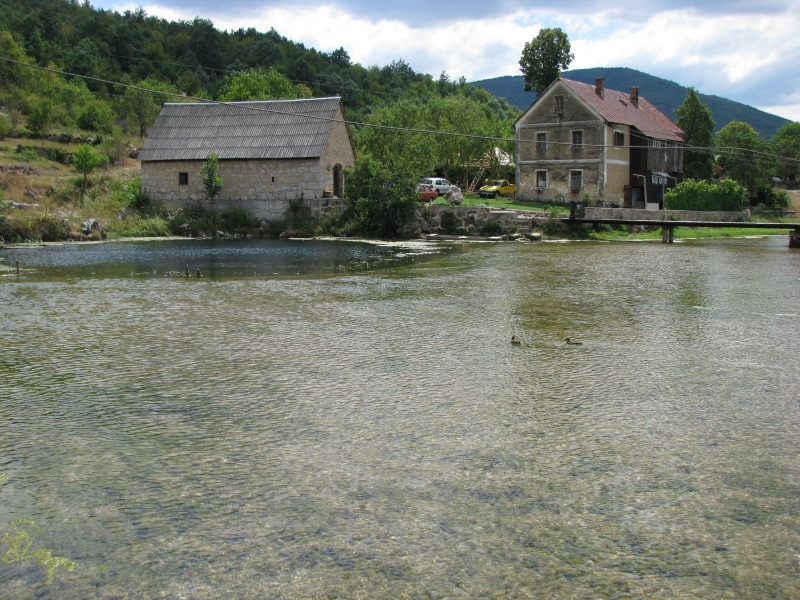

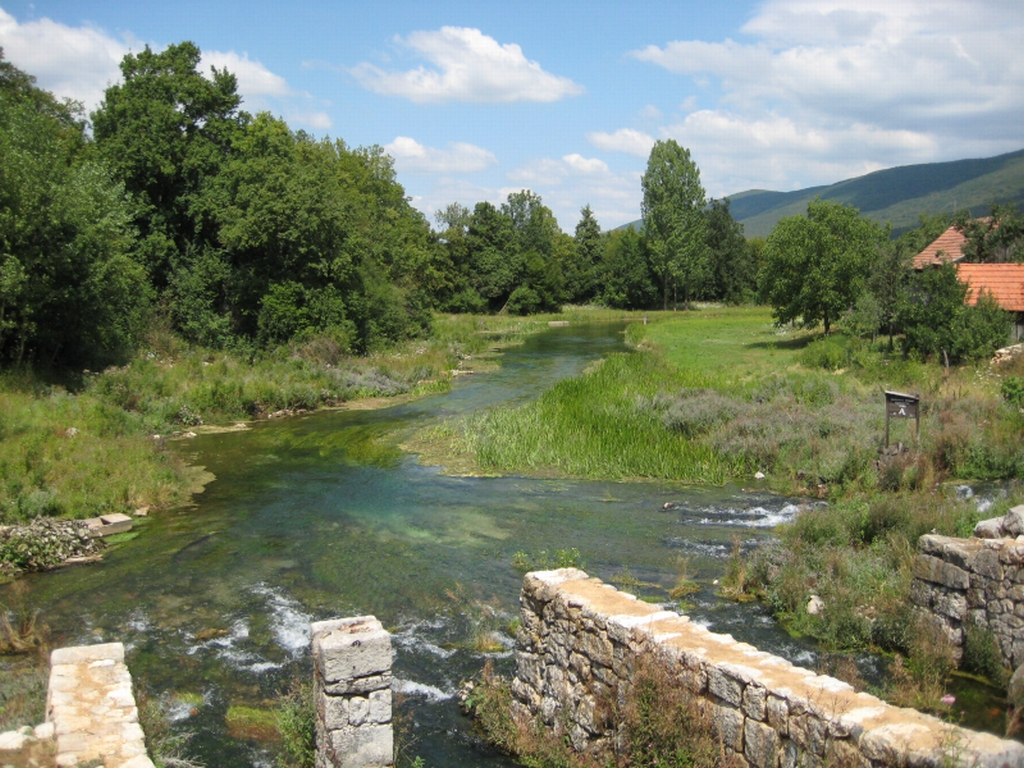
Tonkovićevo vrilo, a source of the Gacka River

The Gacka is a river located in the Lika region of central Croatia.

Because for a large part of its course it is a subterranean river, estimates of its length vary. The aboveground part has undergone substantial human intervention – before it was 32 kilometres (20 miles) long; now it is only 11 kilometres (6.8 miles) long. It has been regulated by man to flow into an aqueduct in Gusić polje (known as Tunel Gacka-Gusić Jezero) and then into the Adriatic Sea through the hydroelectric installation HE Senj near Sveti Juraj. Built in 1965, HE Senj takes inflow from both the Gacka and Lika rivers.

The river passes through karst fields and most notably the town of Otočac, and its headwaters are known as a popular locale for trout fishing.

== See also ==
- Gacko Polje
