= D52 road (Croatia) =

Road in Croatia

D52 state road

Route information
- Length: 41.1 km (25.5 mi)

Major junctions
- From: D23 near Otočac
- To: D1 near Korenica

Location
- Country: Croatia
- Counties: Lika-Senj
- Major cities: Korenica

Highway system
- Highways in Croatia

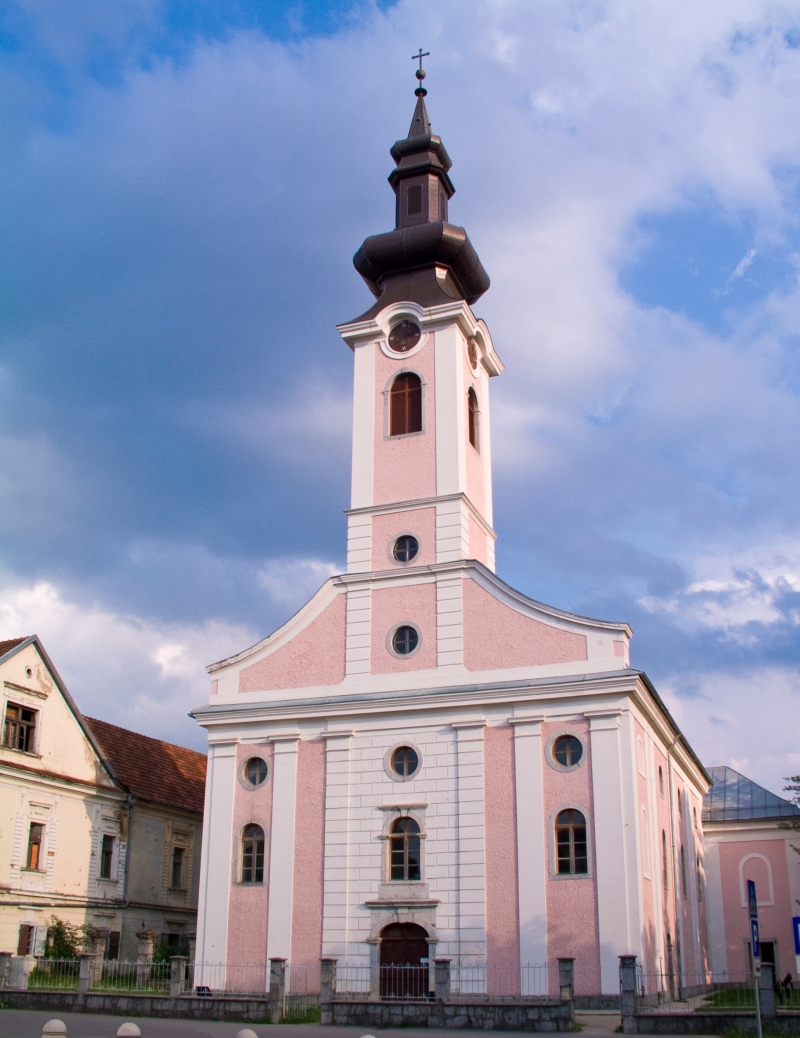
Otočac, near the eastern terminus of the D52 road

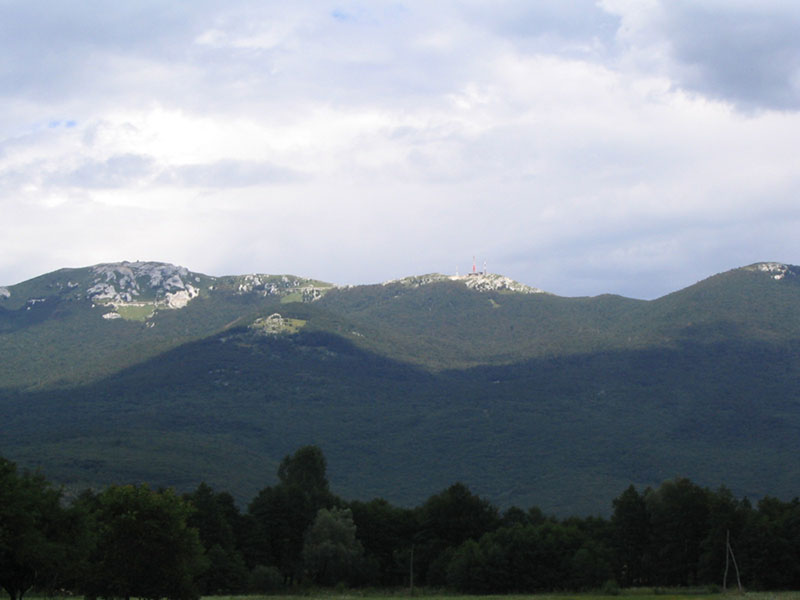
Lička Plješivica seen from Korenica at the eastern terminus of the D52 road

D52 state road, located in Lika region of Croatia connecting cities and towns of Otočac and Korenica, to the state road network of Croatia, and to A1 motorway at Otočac interchange (via D50. The road is 41.1 km (25.5 mi) long.

The D50 state road runs parallel to a section of the A1 motorway between Žuta Lokva and Sveti Rok interchanges, thus serving as an alternate or backup route for the motorway.

The road, as well as all other state roads in Croatia, is managed and maintained by Hrvatske ceste, a state-owned company.

== Traffic volume ==
Traffic is regularly counted and reported by Hrvatske ceste, operator of the road. Substantial variations between annual (AADT) and summer (ASDT) traffic volumes at some counting sites are attributed to the fact that the road connects to D1 and D50 which in turn provide connections to other major highways carrying tourist traffic.

D52 traffic volume
Road	Counting site	AADT	ASDT	Notes
D52	4204 Vrhovine	1,462	2,573	Adjacent to Ž5130 junction.

== Road junctions and populated areas ==
D52 major junctions/populated areas
Type	Slip roads/Notes
	D50 to Otočac and A1 motorway Otočac interchange (to the north) and Gospić (to the south). The western terminus of the road.
	Podhum; Ž5144 to Čovići (D50).
	Zalužnica; Ž5130 to Doljani.
	Vrhovine; Ž5149 to Gornje Vrhovine.
	Gornji Babin Potok
	Ž5150 to Jezerce (D1).
	Homoljac
	Vrelo Koreničko
	D1 to Slunj and Plitvice Lakes National Park (to the north) and to Korenica and Knin (to the south). The eastern terminus of the road.
