= Cerje =

Cerje is a South Slavic toponym, referring to cer, 'Quercus cerris'. It may refer to:

In Albania

- Cerje, Albania, a village near Pustec

In Croatia

- Cerje, Vrbovec, a village near Vrbovec
- Cerje, Zagreb, a village near Zagreb
- Cerje Jesenjsko, a village near Jesenje
- Cerje Letovanićko, a village near Lekenik
- Cerje Nebojse, a village near Maruševec
- Cerje Pokupsko, a village near Pokupsko
- Cerje Samoborsko, a village near Samobor
- Cerje Tužno, a village near Ivanec
- Cerje Vivodinsko, a village near Ozalj
- Ličko Cerje, a village near Lovinac

In Macedonia

- Cerje, Skopje, an archeological site

In Serbia

- Cerje, Bajina Bašta, a village near Bajina Bašta
- Cerje, Kraljevo, a village near Kraljevo
- Cerje (Niš), a village near Niš
