= Homoljac =

Coordinates: 44°46′N 15°38′E

Homoljac Хомољац
- Village
- Interactive map of Homoljac
- Country: Croatia
- County: Lika-Senj
- Municipality: Plitvička Jezera

Area
  - Total: 9.9 sq mi (25.6 km^{2})

Population (2021)
  - Total: 10
  - Density: 1.0/sq mi (0.39/km^{2})
- Time zone: UTC+1 (CET)
  - Summer (DST): UTC+2 (CEST)

Homoljac (Serbian Cyrillic: Хомољац) is a village in Plitvička Jezera, Croatia. It is connected by the D52 highway.

== Geography ==
Homoljac is about 11 km northwest of Korenica. It is located between Vrelo Korenicko and Gornji Babin Potok.

== History ==
After the breakup of Yugoslavia, Homoljac was in the Republic of Serbian Krajina. Until the territorial reorganization in Croatia, the settlement was part of the former municipality of Korenica.

== Demographics ==
According to the 2011 census, Homoljac had a population of 21.
