= Ričice =

Ričice may refer to:

- Ričice, Lika-Senj County, a village near Lovinac, Croatia
- Ričice, Split-Dalmatia County, a village near Proložac, Croatia
- Ričice, Travnik, a village in Bosnia and Herzegovina

== See also ==
- Ričica
