= D522 road =

Road in Croatia

D522 state road

Route information
- Length: 13.2 km (8.2 mi)

Major junctions
- From: D1 near Udbina
- To: A1 in Gornja Ploča interchange

Location
- Country: Croatia
- Counties: Lika-Senj

Highway system
- Highways in Croatia

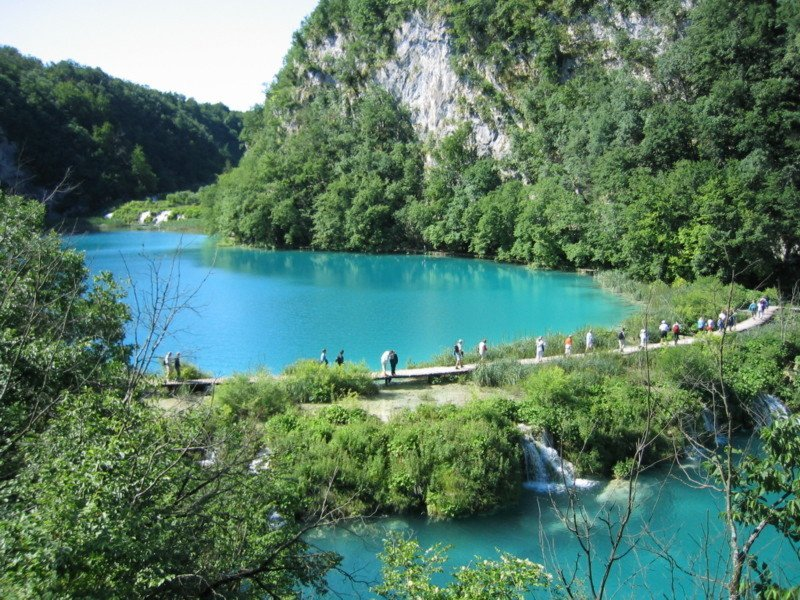
Plitvice Lakes National Park, accessed from the A1 motorway via the D522 road

D522 is a state road in the Lika region of Croatia that connects the A1 motorway's Gornja Ploča interchange to the D1 state road, facilitating access from A1 motorway to Plitvice Lakes National Park. The road is 13.2 km long.

The D522 is a brza cesta (expressway), a limited-access road with an increased speed limit.

Like all state roads in Croatia, the D522 is managed and maintained by Hrvatske ceste, state owned company.

== Traffic volume ==
Traffic is regularly counted and reported by Hrvatske ceste, operator of the road. Substantial variations between annual (AADT) and summer (ASDT) traffic volumes are attributed to the fact that the road serves as A1 motorway connector, carrying substantial tourist traffic especially to Plitvice Lakes National Park.

D522 traffic volume
| Road | Counting site | AADT | ASDT | Notes |
| D522 | 4918 Lovinac | 1,600 | 3,935 | Adjacent to Ž5165 junction. AADT estimated by Hrvatske ceste. |

== Road junctions ==
D522 junctions
| Type | Slip roads/Notes |
| | D1 near Udbina to Plitvice Lakes National Park to the north. Northern terminus of the road. Northbound D522 traffic defaults to northbound D1 and conversely, southbound D1 traffic defaults to southbound D522, unless it follows an interchange exit to proceed further south down D1 to Knin. |
| | Ž5196 to Udbina. |
| | L59112 to Komić. |
| | Ž5165 to Lovinac and Gornja Ploča village. |
| | Gornja Ploča interchange. A1 to Zadar and Split to the south and to Gospić and Zagreb to the north. Southern terminus of the road. |

== See also ==
- Plitvice Lakes National Park
