= Vranik =

Vranik may refer to:

- Vraník, a village near Kutná Hora, Czech Republic
- Vranik, Croatia, a village near Gospić
