= Štikada =

- Village
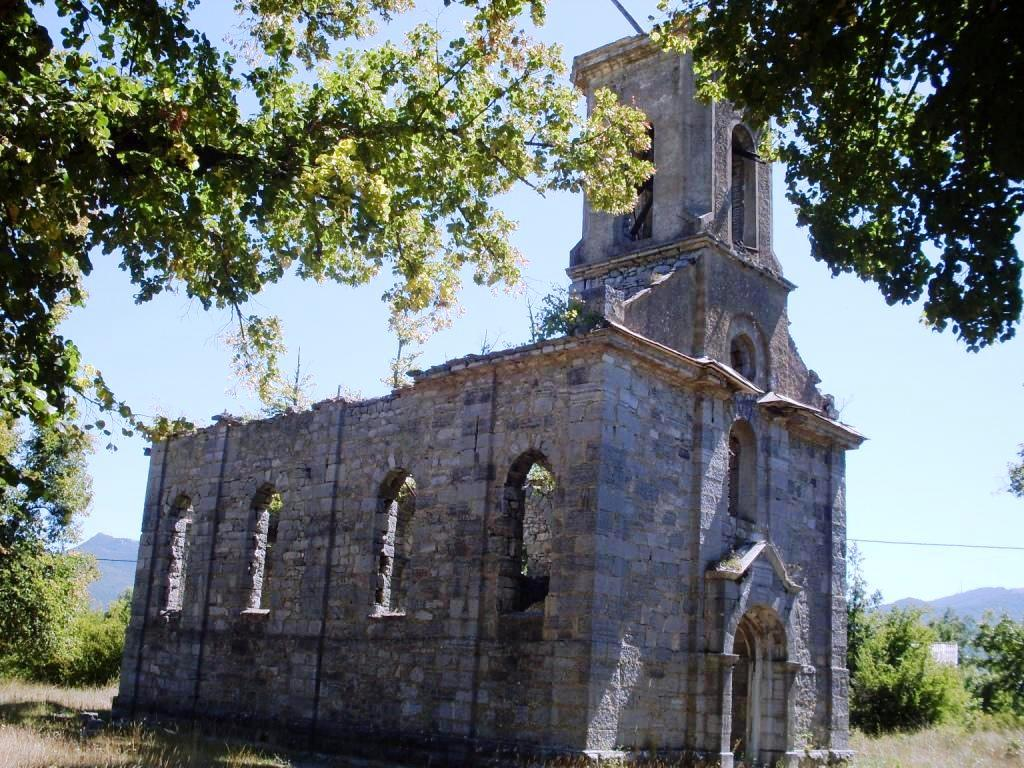
- Serbian Orthodox Church of St. Apostles Peter and Paul, destroyed in World War II

- Location within Croatia
- Coordinates: 44°18′57″N 15°47′46″E
- Country: Croatia
- County: Lika-Senj
- Municipality: Lovinac

Area
  - Total: 35.1 km^{2} (13.6 sq mi)
- Elevation: 558 m (1,831 ft)

Population (2021)
  - Total: 197
  - Density: 5.61/km^{2} (14.5/sq mi)
- Time zone: UTC+1 (CET)
  - Summer (DST): UTC+2 (CEST)
- Postal code: 53244
- Area code: 053

Štikada is a village in the Lika-Senj County, Croatia. The settlement is administered as a part of Lovinac municipality.

== Location ==
It is located in Lika, 5 kilometers from Gračac, on the state road D50.

== Population ==
According to national census of 2011, population of the settlement is 216. The majority of the population are Serbs.

Year	Population
1857	2425
1869	2307
1880	1709
1890	1643
1900	1787
1910	1709
1921	1780
1931	2437
1948	497
1953	523
1961	601
1971	554
1981	513
1991	545
2001	175
2011	216
