= Smokrić =

Settlement in Lika-Senj County, Croatia

- Settlement
- Interactive map of Smokrić
- Location of Smokrić in Croatia
- Coordinates: 44°23′16″N 15°44′14″E
- Country: Croatia
- County: Lika-Senj
- Municipality: Lovinac

Area
  - Total: 27.1 km^{2} (10.5 sq mi)

Population (2021)
  - Total: 13
  - Density: 0.48/km^{2} (1.2/sq mi)
- Time zone: UTC+1 (CET)
  - Summer (DST): UTC+2 (CEST)
- Postal code: 23440 Gračac
- Area code: +385 (0)53

Smokrić is a settlement in the Municipality of Lovinac in Croatia. In 2021, its population was 13.

== Demographics ==
Smokrić: Population trends 1857–2021
v

population	792	716	582	811	859	793	739	732	472	424	288	257	177	102	55	23	13
	1857	1869	1880	1890	1900	1910	1921	1931	1948	1953	1961	1971	1981	1991	2001	2011	2021

Sources: Croatian Bureau of Statistics publications
