= Kik, Croatia =

Kik
- Village
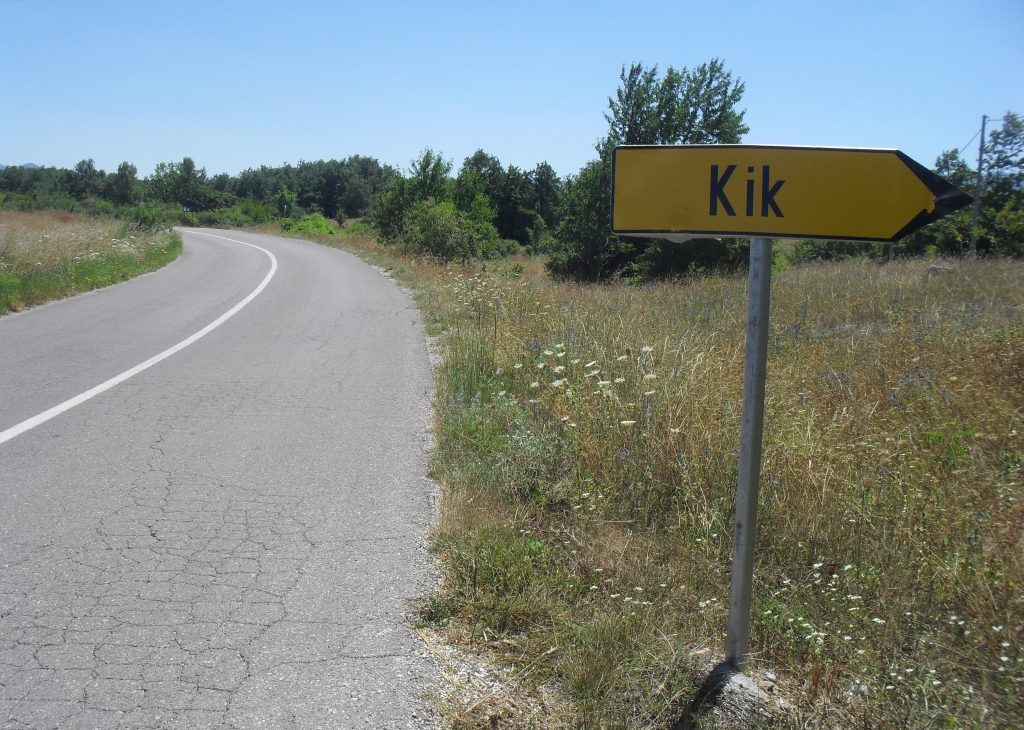
- A sign at the entrance to the village Kik

- Location within Croatia
- Coordinates: 44°25′31″N 15°38′31″E
- Country: Croatia
- Region: Lika
- County: Lika-Senj
- Municipality: Lovinac

Area
  - Total: 7.6 km^{2} (2.9 sq mi)
- Elevation: 597 m (1,959 ft)

Population (2021)
  - Total: 8
  - Density: 1.1/km^{2} (2.7/sq mi)
- Time zone: UTC+1 (CET)
  - Summer (DST): UTC+2 (CEST)
- Postal code: 53244
- Area code: 053

Kik is a small village in the Lovinac municipality, in Lika–Senj County, Croatia.

== Population/Demographics ==
According to national census of 2011, population of the settlement is 4. The majority of the population are Serbs.

Year	Population
1857	345
1869	338
1880	247
1890	318
1900	352
1910	331
1921	365
1931	358
1948	231
1953	243
1961	232
1971	171
1981	134
1991	126
2001	3
2011	4
