= Raduč =

- Village
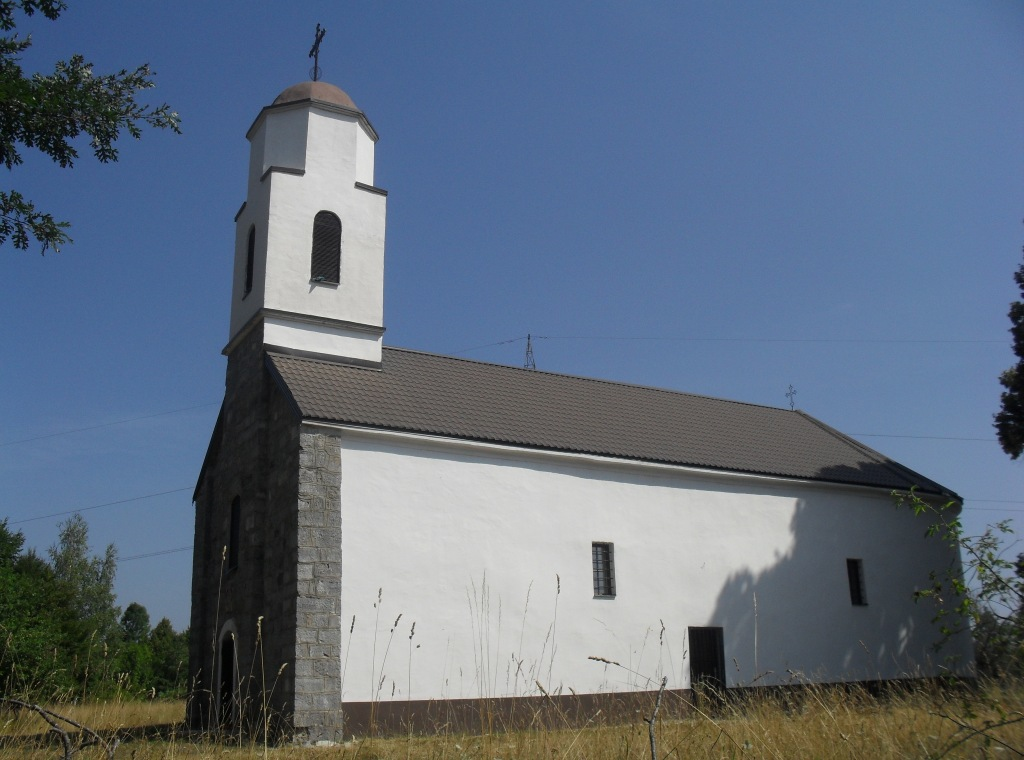
- Serbian Orthodox church in Raduč

- Location within Croatia
- Coordinates: 44°23′57″N 15°35′06″E
- Country: Croatia
- County: Lika-Senj
- Municipality: Lovinac

Area
  - Total: 41.2 km^{2} (15.9 sq mi)
- Elevation: 624 m (2,047 ft)

Population (2021)
  - Total: 40
  - Density: 0.97/km^{2} (2.5/sq mi)
- Time zone: UTC+1 (CET)
  - Summer (DST): UTC+2 (CEST)
- Postal code: 53244
- Area code: 053

Raduč is a village in the Lika-Senj County, Croatia. The settlement is administered as a part of Lovinac municipality.

== Location ==
It is located in Lika, 25 kilometers from Gračac, on the state road D50.

== Population/Demographics ==
According to national census of 2011, population of the settlement is 12.

Year	Population
1857	1310
1869	850
1880	875
1890	1015
1900	1110
1910	1081
1921	945
1931	909
1948	729
1953	704
1961	724
1971	523
1981	407
1991	336
2001	11
2011	12

== Notable people ==
- Milutin Tesla, Serbian orthodox priest, father of Nikola Tesla

It is miss understood that the family of the great Nikola Tesla is from Smiljan, Austro-Hungary, later Yugoslavia. Tesla's family are from the village of Raduč, Lika. The reason Nikola Tesla was born in Smiljan instead of Raduč, is because his father Milutin, a Serbian-Orthodox priest was on duty in Smiljan, where the Serbian-Orthodox church was his responsibility. The house next to the church was given to him (Milutin Tesla), while he was serving in Smiljan, which is why Nikola Tesla was born there and not in Raduč. Due to the ethnic cleansing of Serbs from today's Croatia carried out in the 90s there are almost no people left in the village. However, Milka Tesla, still lives in Raduč.

- Rade Čubrilo, Serbian military leader
