= Gornja Ploča =

- Village
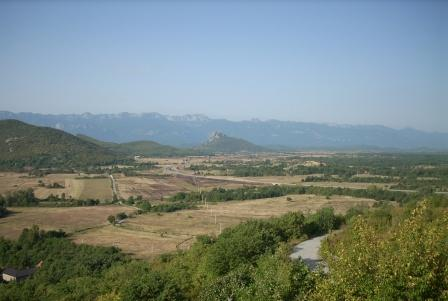
- Gornja Ploča

- Location within Croatia
- Coordinates: 44°26′39″N 15°39′52″E
- Country: Croatia
- Region: Lika
- County: Lika-Senj
- Municipality: Lovinac

Area
  - Total: 31.4 km^{2} (12.1 sq mi)
- Elevation: 625 m (2,051 ft)

Population (2021)
  - Total: 43
  - Density: 1.4/km^{2} (3.5/sq mi)
- Time zone: UTC+1 (CET)
  - Summer (DST): UTC+2 (CEST)
- Postal code: 53244
- Area code: 053

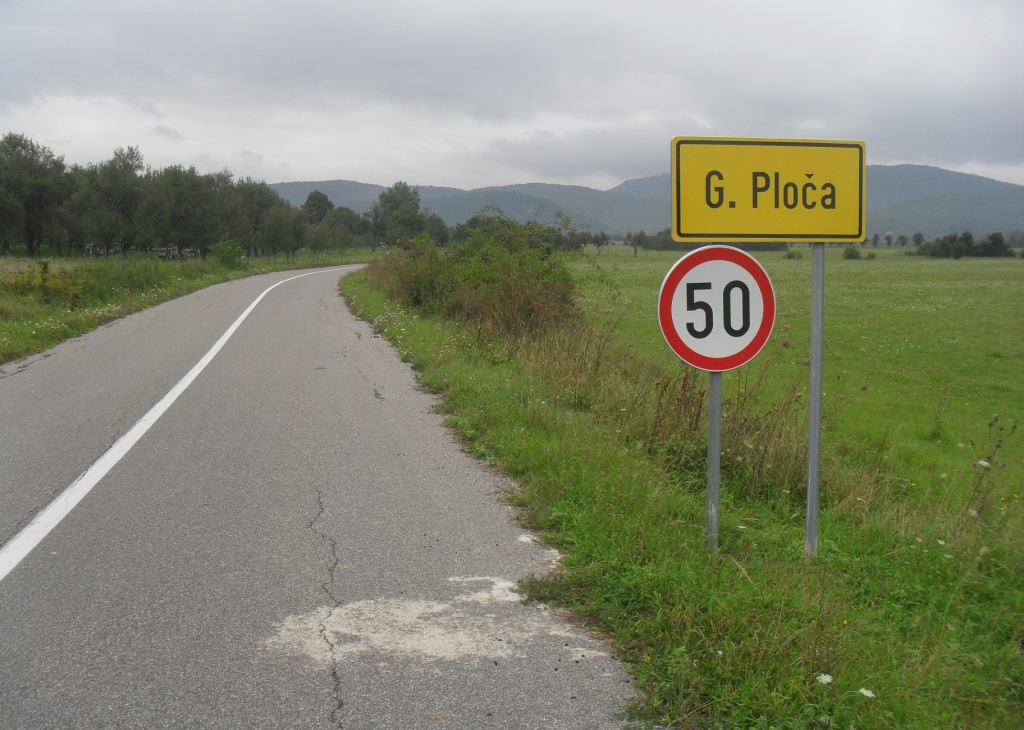
Traffic sign at the village entrance

Gornja Ploča is a village in the Lika-Senj County, Croatia. The settlement is administered as a part of Lovinac municipality.

== Location ==
Gornja Ploča is placed between Gospić and Gračac. It is located 27 kilometers from Gospić, 8 kilometres from Lovinac, and 3.6 kilometers from the Zagreb-Split highway. Gornja Ploča is located on state road D522, that connects the highway with Udbina and Plitvice.

== Population/Demographics ==
According to national census of 2001, population of the settlement is 22.

Year	Population
1857	1,163
1869	1,343
1880	1,287
1890	1,435
1900	1,555
1910	1,410
1921	1,452
1931	1,502
1948	996
1953	939
1961	924
1971	675
1981	494
1991	344
2001	22
2011	45

== Sources ==
- Gornja Ploča (in Serbian)
