= Gornji Babin Potok =

Coordinates: 44°50′N 15°32′E

- Village
- Interactive map of Gornji Babin Potok
- Country: Croatia
- County: Lika-Senj
- Municipality: Vrhovine

Area
  - Total: 11.2 sq mi (28.9 km^{2})

Population (2021)
  - Total: 54
  - Density: 4.8/sq mi (1.9/km^{2})
- Time zone: UTC+1 (CET)
  - Summer (DST): UTC+2 (CEST)

Gornji Babin Potok is a village in Croatia. It is connected by the D52 highway.
