= Sveti Rok =

- Village
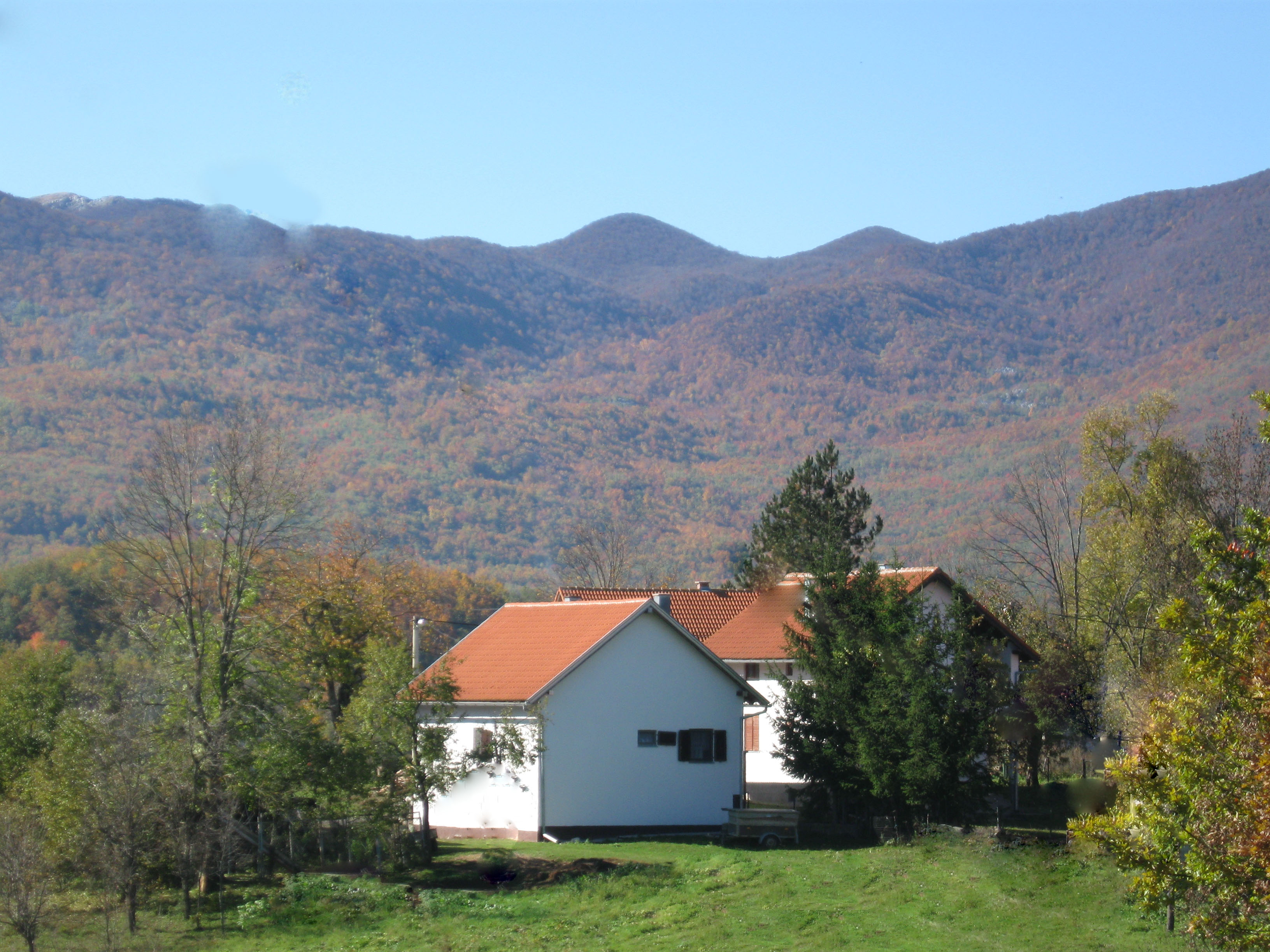
- A farm near Sveti Rok and Velebit Mountain.

- Location within Croatia
- Coordinates: 44.361368°N 15.653636°E
- Country: Croatia
- County: Lika-Senj
- Municipality: Lovinac

Area
  - Total: 102.8 km^{2} (39.7 sq mi)

Population (2021)
  - Total: 250
  - Density: 2.4/km^{2} (6.3/sq mi)
- Time zone: UTC+1 Central European Time

Sveti Rok is a village in the Lovinac municipality, in Lika–Senj County, Croatia, in the vicinity of Sveti Rok mountain. The Sveti Rok Tunnel's northern entrance is south of the village. In the 2011 census Sveti Rok had a population of 292 and the majority were Croats.

== History ==
Until 1918, Sveti Rok (named Sanct Roch before 1850) was part of the Austrian monarchy (Kingdom of Croatia-Slavonia after the compromise of 1867), in the Croatian Military Frontier, Likaner Regiment N°I. The village named after Saint Roch.

== Notable people ==
- Mile Budak, Ustaše ideologist
