= Vrelo Koreničko =

Coordinates: 44°46′N 15°40′E

- Village
- Interactive map of Vrelo Koreničko
- Country: Croatia
- County: Lika-Senj
- Municipality: Plitvička Jezera

Area
  - Total: 2.6 sq mi (6.8 km^{2})

Population (2021)
  - Total: 102
  - Density: 39/sq mi (15/km^{2})
- Time zone: UTC+1 (CET)
  - Summer (DST): UTC+2 (CEST)

Vrelo Koreničko (Serbian Cyrillic: Врело Кореничко) is a village in Plitvička Jezera, Croatia. It is connected by the D52 highway.
