= Ličko Cerje =

- Location within Croatia
- Coordinates: 44°22′N 15°41′E
- Country: Croatia
- County: Lika-Senj
- Municipality: Lovinac

Area
  - Total: 19.0 km^{2} (7.3 sq mi)

Population (2021)
  - Total: 62
  - Density: 3.3/km^{2} (8.5/sq mi)
- Time zone: UTC+1 (CET)
  - Summer (DST): UTC+2 (CEST)

Licko Cerje is a village in the municipality of Lovinac, Lika-Senj County, Croatia. In the 2011 census, the population was 88, and there were 40 households in the village.

== Historical population ==
The population has changed over time:

- 1857: 963
- 1869: 1,053
- 1880: 689
- 1890: 811
- 1900: 801
- 1910: 640
- 1921: 644
- 1931: 633
- 1948: 596
- 1953: 565
- 1961: 502
- 1971: 409
- 1981: 287
- 1991: 196
- 2001: 117
- 2011: 88
