= Joksim Nović-Otočanin =

Joksim Nović-Otočanin Јоксим Новић-Оточанин
- Born: 15 March 1807; Zalužnica, Austrian Empire
- Died: 18 January 1868 (aged 60); Novi Sad, Austro-Hungarian Empire
- Occupations: adventurer, writer

Joksim Nović-Otočanin (15 March 1807, in Zalužnica – 18 January 1868, in Novi Sad) was a Serbian adventurer, freedom fighter, and romantic writer of verse and prose.

== Biography ==
Joksim Nović was born in Zalužnica, in Lika, on 15 March 1807. He completed his secondary education at the Serbian Gymnasium in Sremski Karlovci, studied philosophy at Jena, Göttingen, The Hague, and law in Sárospatak and in Vienna. Very little is known about him after graduation. We know he was in the royal guard of Mihailo Obrenović in the Principality of Serbia for a while. Then he went to Bosnia to fight the Ottoman occupiers and was captured. He was subsequently loaded with irons and sent a prisoner to a Turkish goal at Sarajevo. For the next two years, he was kept in close confinement. When he was released he was famous for defying the authorities. In 1847 he wrote a book of verse called Lazarica and had it published in Novi Sad. With Joksim Nović, now nicknamed Otočanin (the Incarcerated), a new voice seems to enter Serbian writing, or an old voice speaking virtually a new language. The advice was given to him years back by Vuk Karadžić (to write as common folk speak) and Adam Mickiewicz (the exiled Polish poet who suggested that he take the Kosovo cycle and turn it into a national epic) now bore fruit. Before the 1848 Revolution, the Serbs in the Habsburg Monarchy were being faced by grave challenges. Otočanin played an important part in the revolutionary events of 1848/4, first as a member of a delegation to Vienna and later joining a group of Serbs formed to draft the constitution of Serbian Vojvodina. Prominent among them was the young lawyer Mojsije Georgijević of Osijek, and physician writer Jovan Stejić. Joksim Nović-Otočanin was exposed to some of the dangers of the 1848 Revolution, and, it is said, escaped getting killed only by his presence of mind. In 1849 he moved to Serbia, and resided in Novi Sad till his death. There he wrote some of the most memorable romantic poems about Hajduk Veljko, Vasa Čarapić, Janko Katić, Stanoje Glavaš (1860–61), Ilija Birčanin (1862), Dušanija: Znati Dogadjaji za Vremena Carstva (Dušan and the Matter of the Serbian Empire; 1863), Moskovija: Krimski Rat (Moscow: the Crimean War; 1863), Karađorđe izbavitelj Srbije (Karageorge: Emancipator of Serbia, 1865).

== Prose ==
- Sila turči Bosnu (1864)
- Kapetan Radič Petrović i pokrštenica Zorka (1866)
- Hajdučki život (1861-1863)
- Starine od Starina Novaka ili školovanje narodnjeg pjevanja i pripovijedanja (1867)
- Translation of Homer's Illyad (unfinished)
