= Vranik, Croatia =

Settlement in Lika-Senj County, Croatia

Vranik
- Settlement
- Interactive map of Vranik
- Location of Vranik in Croatia
- Coordinates: 44°25′53″N 15°41′26″E
- Country: Croatia
- County: Lika-Senj
- Municipality: Lovinac

Area
  - Total: 10.1 km^{2} (3.9 sq mi)

Population (2021)
  - Total: 8
  - Density: 0.79/km^{2} (2.1/sq mi)
- Time zone: UTC+1 (CET)
  - Summer (DST): UTC+2 (CEST)
- Postal code: 23440 Gračac
- Area code: +385 (0)53

Vranik is a settlement in the Municipality of Lovinac in Croatia. In 2021, its population was 8.

== Geography ==
To the west it borders the settlement of Gornja Ploča, and on the other three sides the settlement is surrounded by the Lika Central Highlands . Vranik is about 8 km from Lovinac, and about 4 km from Gornja Ploča.

== History ==
Vranik was first mentioned in a list of fortifications conquered by the Turks in 1577. It is not known who built it, but Bishop Sebastian Glavinić, in his description of Lika and Krbava from 1696, mentions the Vranich family, who lived in the town of Vranik even before the arrival of the Turks. The present-day settlement of Vranik was established on the very edge of a fertile valley below the fortified town, the remains of which can still be seen on the Gradina hill.

From the breakup of Yugoslavia until August 1995, Vranik was located in Licko-Senjska zupanija. The settlement is part of the municipality of Lovinac.

== Demographics ==
Vranik: Population trends 1857–2021
v

population	566	554	439	402	424	356	318	291	221	192	141	98	74	49	19	7	8
	1857	1869	1880	1890	1900	1910	1921	1931	1948	1953	1961	1971	1981	1991	2001	2011	2021

Sources: Croatian Bureau of Statistics publications
