= List of prefects of Lika-Senj County =

This is a list of prefects of Lika-Senj County.

== Prefects of Lika-Senj County (1993–present) ==
Croatian Democratic Union (HDZ)

| № | Portrait | Name (Born–Died) | Term of Office | | Party |
|---|---|---|---|---|---|
| 1 | | Ante Frković (1943–2011) | 4 May 1993 | 2001 | HDZ |
| 2 | | Milan Jurković (1959–) | 2001 | 2013 | HDZ |
| 3 | | Milan Kolić (1964–) | 2013 | 25 May 2017 | HDZ |
| 4 | | Darko Milinović (1963–) | 25 May 2017 | 4 June 2021 | HDZ (2017–2018) |
| | | Darko Milinović (1963–) | 25 May 2017 | 4 June 2021 | Independent (from 2018) |
| 5 | | Ernest Petry (1974–) | 4 June 2021 | Incumbent | HDZ |

== See also ==
- Lika-Senj County
