= Gornje Vrhovine =

Coordinates: 44°50′N 15°27′E

Gornje Vrhovine Горње Врховине (Serbian)
- Village
- Interactive map of Gornje Vrhovine
- Country: Croatia
- County: Lika-Senj
- Municipality: Vrhovine

Area
  - Total: 12.6 sq mi (32.6 km^{2})

Population (2021)
  - Total: 150
  - Density: 12/sq mi (4.6/km^{2})
- Time zone: UTC+1 (CET)
  - Summer (DST): UTC+2 (CEST)

Gornje Vrhovine (Serbian Cyrillic: Горње Врховине) is a village in Croatia, known until 1961 as Crna Vlast.
