= Ričice, Lika-Senj County =

Settlement in Lika-Senj County, Croatia

Ričice
- Settlement
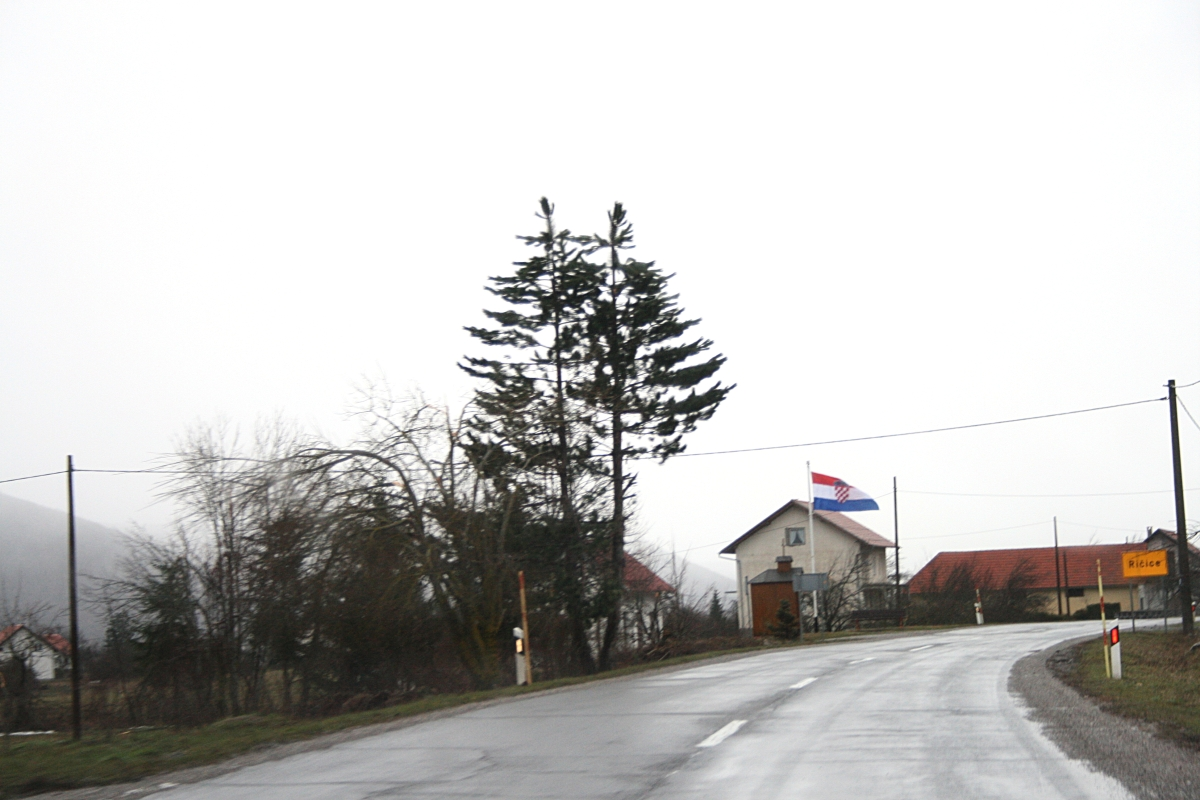
- Interactive map of Ričice
- Location of Ričice in Croatia
- Coordinates: 44°20′13″N 15°44′41″E
- Country: Croatia
- County: Lika-Senj
- Municipality: Lovinac

Area
  - Total: 45.8 km^{2} (17.7 sq mi)

Population (2021)
  - Total: 80
  - Density: 1.7/km^{2} (4.5/sq mi)
- Time zone: UTC+1 (CET)
  - Summer (DST): UTC+2 (CEST)
- Postal code: 23440 Gračac
- Area code: +385 (0)53

Ričice is a settlement in the Municipality of Lovinac in Croatia. In 2021, its population was 80.

== Demographics ==
Ričice: Population trends 1857–2021
v

population	998	948	701	808	883	740	732	718	675	594	500	376	268	169	114	76	80
	1857	1869	1880	1890	1900	1910	1921	1931	1948	1953	1961	1971	1981	1991	2001	2011	2021

Sources: Croatian Bureau of Statistics publications
