= Vrhovine =

Vrhovine Врховине (Serbian)
- Municipality
- Municipality of Vrhovine; Općina Vrhovine
- Coat of arms

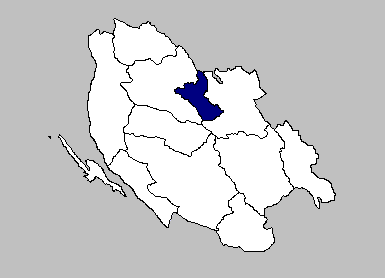
- Vrhovine municipality within Lika-Senj County

- Location within Croatia
- Coordinates: 44°50′N 15°35′E
- Country: Croatia
- County: Lika-Senj County

Government
  - Municipal mayor: Milorad Delić (SDSS)

Area
  - Municipality: 225.3 km^{2} (87.0 sq mi)
  - Urban: 29.8 km^{2} (11.5 sq mi)

Population (2021)
  - Municipality: 653
  - Density: 2.90/km^{2} (7.51/sq mi)
  - Urban: 218
  - Urban density: 7.32/km^{2} (18.9/sq mi)
- Time zone: UTC+1 (CET)
  - Summer (DST): UTC+2 (CEST)
- Postal code: 53220 Otočac
- Website: vrhovine.hr

Vrhovine (Serbian Cyrillic: Врховине) is a settlement and a municipality in Lika-Senj County, Croatia. The municipality is located in Lika.

== Demographics ==
Historical population
Year	Pop.	±%
1857	5,104	—
1869	5,096	−0.2%
1880	4,564	−10.4%
1890	4,965	+8.8%
1900	5,437	+9.5%
1910	5,412	−0.5%
1921	5,737	+6.0%
1931	5,745	+0.1%
1948	4,108	−28.5%
1953	4,034	−1.8%
1961	3,821	−5.3%
1971	3,193	−16.4%
1981	2,783	−12.8%
1991	2,453	−11.9%
2001	905	−63.1%
2011	1,381	+52.6%
2021	653	−52.7%
Source: Naselja i stanovništvo Republike Hrvatske 1857–2021, DZS

In the 2001 census, Vrhovine had 905 inhabitants of which 55.03% were Serbs and 38.45% were Croats. In the 2011 census, there were 1,381 inhabitants of which 80.23% were Serbs and 12.74% were Croats.

In 2021, the municipality had 653 residents in the following 7 settlements:

- Donji Babin Potok, population 72
- Gornje Vrhovine, population 150
- Gornji Babin Potok, population 54
- Rudopolje, population 32
- Turjanski, population 26
- Vrhovine, population 218
- Zalužnica, population 101
Vrhovine: Population trends 1857–2021
v

population	5104	5096	4564	4965	5437	5412	5737	5745	4108	4034	3821	3193	2783	2453	905	1381	653
	1857	1869	1880	1890	1900	1910	1921	1931	1948	1953	1961	1971	1981	1991	2001	2011	2021

Sources: Croatian Bureau of Statistics publications

The majority of the population of the municipality is elderly. Because of this, the Croatian Ministry of Family Affairs, War Veterans and Intergenerational Solidarity and the United Nations Development Programme secured funding for a centre for the elderly. The centre was opened by Minister Jadranka Kosor in June, 2008.

== Politics ==
=== Languages and names ===
On the territory of Vrhovine municipality, in addition to Croatian which is official in the whole country, Serbian language and Serbian Cyrillic alphabet have been introduced as a second official language. As of 2023, most of the legal requirements for the fulfillment of bilingual standards have not been carried out. Official buildings do have Cyrillic signage, but not street signs, traffic signs or seals. Cyrillic is not used on any official documents, nor are there public legal and administrative employees proficient in the script.

=== Minority councils and representatives ===
Directly elected minority councils and representatives are tasked with consulting tasks for the local or regional authorities in which they are advocating for minority rights and interests, integration into public life and participation in the management of local affairs. At the 2023 Croatian national minorities councils and representatives elections Serbs of Croatia fulfilled legal requirements to elect 10 members minority council of the Municipality of Vrhovine.
