= Cerje (Bajina Bašta) =

Coordinates: 43°58′N 19°44′E

- Village (Selo)
- Interactive map of Cerje (Bajina Bašta)
- Country: Serbia
- District: Šumadija
- Municipality: Bajina Bašta

Population (2002)
  - Total: 168
- Time zone: UTC+1 (CET)
  - Summer (DST): UTC+2 (CEST)

Cerje (Serbian Cyrillic: Церје) is a village in the municipality of Bajina Bašta, Serbia.

== Population ==
According to the 2002 census, the village had a population of 168.
