= Lovinac, Lika-Senj County =

Municipality in Lika-Senj, Croatia

Lovinac
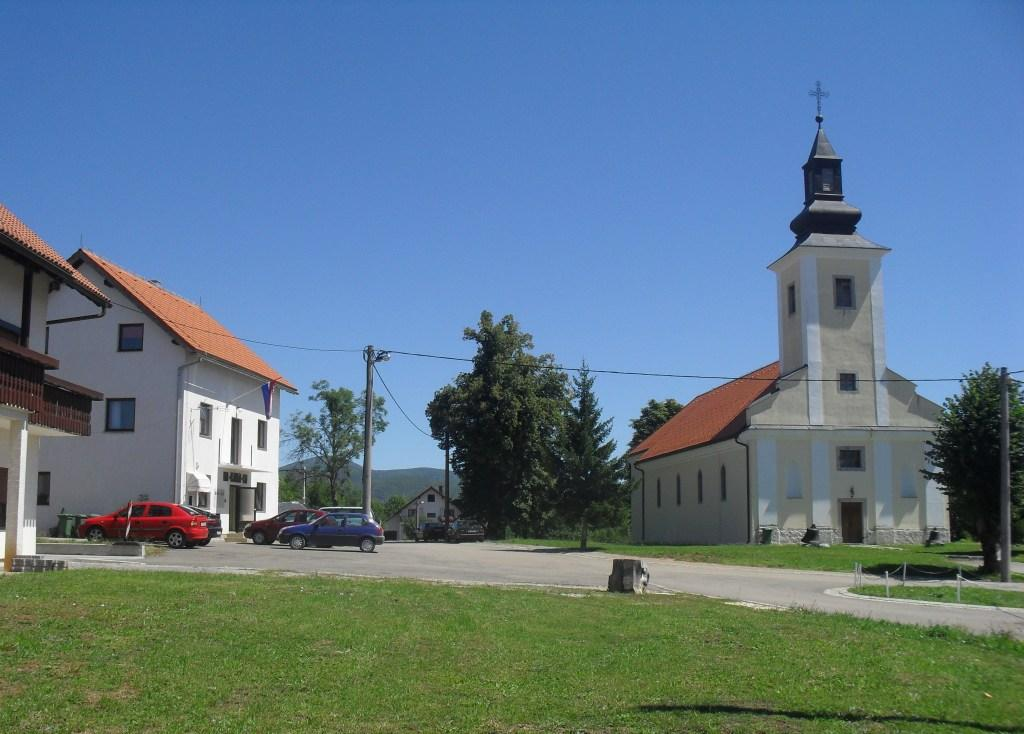

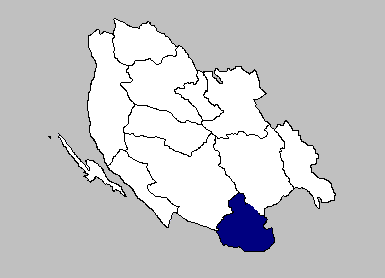
- Lovinac municipality within Lika-Senj County
- Interactive map of Lovinac
- Location within Croatia
- Coordinates: 44.39°N 15.69°E
- Country: Croatia
- County: Lika-Senj County

Government
  - Mayor: Ivan Miletić (Independent)

Area
  - Total: 345.8 km^{2} (133.5 sq mi)

Population (2021)
  - Total: 943
  - Density: 2.73/km^{2} (7.06/sq mi)
- Time zone: UTC+1 (CET)
  - Summer (DST): UTC+2 (CEST)
- Postal code: 23440 Gračac
- Website: lovinac.hr

Lovinac is a village and a municipality in Lika-Senj County, Croatia.

== Geography ==
The village of Lovinac is located 35 kilometers from Gospić to the southeast of the greatest Croatian karst field, Licko polje. At one time, the shortest trade routes from Lika's interior to the sea went through Lovinac.

The new highway which was recently built alongside the village has resulted in more tourism.

== Climate ==
Since records began in 1960, the highest temperature recorded at the local weather station was 39.6 °C (103.3 °F), on 5 August 2017. The coldest temperature was −32.5 °C (−26.5 °F), on 13 January 2003.

== Demographics ==
In 2021, the municipality had 943 residents in the following 10 settlements:

- Gornja Ploča, population 43
- Kik, population 8
- Ličko Cerje, population 62
- Lovinac, population 242
- Raduč, population 40
- Ričice, population 80
- Smokrić, population 13
- Sveti Rok, population 250
- Štikada, population 197
- Vranik, population 8
Lovinac: Population trends 1857–2021
v

population	12120	11456	9239	10208	11019	10140	10102	10783	6750	6450	5911	4929	3721	3054	1096	1007	943
	1857	1869	1880	1890	1900	1910	1921	1931	1948	1953	1961	1971	1981	1991	2001	2011	2021

Sources: Croatian Bureau of Statistics publications

In 2011, Croats represented 90% of the population.

== Politics ==
=== Minority councils and representatives ===
Directly elected minority councils and representatives are tasked with consulting tasks for the local or regional authorities in which they are advocating for minority rights and interests, integration into public life and participation in the management of local affairs. At the 2023 Croatian national minorities councils and representatives elections Serbs of Croatia fulfilled legal requirements to elect 10 members minority council of the Municipality of Lovinac.

== Villages ==
- Gornja Ploča - 22
- Kik - 3
- Ličko Cerje - 117
- Lovinac - 288
- Raduč - 11
- Ričice - 114
- Smokrić - 55
- Sveti Rok - 292
- Štikada - 175
- Vranik - 19

Pilar (population 45) and Vrkljani (population 27) are hamlets near Lovinac.

== History ==
Above the town of Lovinac are the ruins of the medieval city of Lovinac in which artifacts from the Roman period have been found. In the Middle Ages the village was under the control of the noble family Lovinčić. At the beginning of the 16th century it belonged to count Ivan Karlovic. The Turks conquered it around 1522. After the expulsion of the Turks in 1689 the current Bunjevac population was brought in to settle the area. The Zdunich noble family came here after helping in the reconquest of the area. They were subsequently ennobled and a branch is present here to this day.

== Economy ==
The production of clothes and underwear usually takes place during the winter months from prepared wool, flax and hemp. Some parts of the native costume, especially vests, are decorated with gold or silver coins and toka. Also produced are type of local footwear called opanci.

== Monuments and landmarks ==
- Old fort Lovinac
- Zdunić tower
- Kovacevic kula: notable for its being the only building in Lika left over from the time of Turk occupation. It is House 50 in Vranik.

== Education ==
- Lovinac elementary school
