= Cerje, Kraljevo =

Cerje Церје (Serbian)
- Village (Selo)
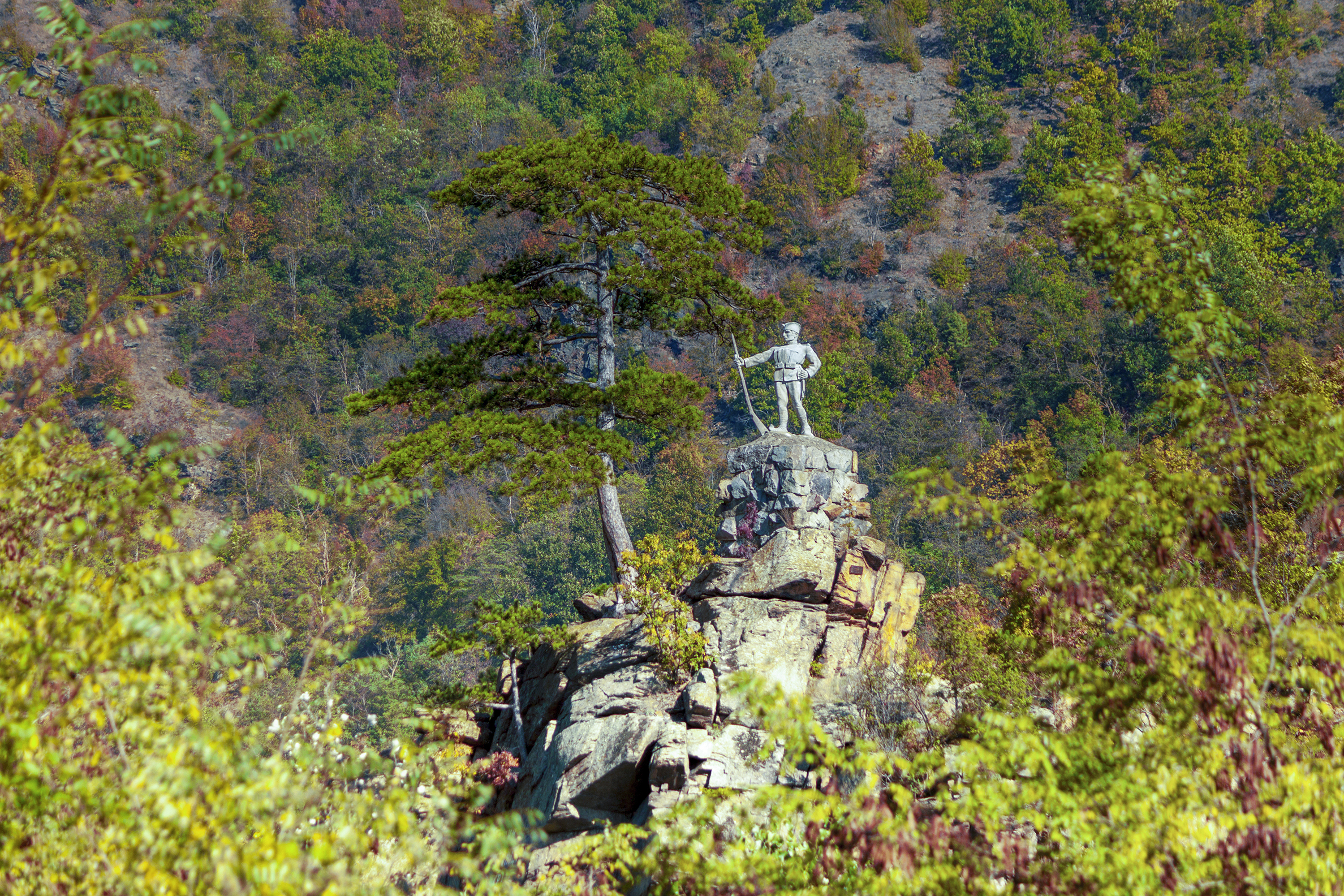

- Location within Serbia
- Coordinates: 43°30′N 20°37′E
- Country: Serbia
- District: Raška District
- Municipality: Kraljevo

Area
  - Total: 30.50 km^{2} (11.78 sq mi)
- Elevation: 716 m (2,349 ft)

Population (2011)
  - Total: 537
  - Density: 17.6/km^{2} (45.6/sq mi)
- Time zone: UTC+1 (CET)
  - Summer (DST): UTC+2 (CEST)

Cerje (Serbian Cyrillic: Церје) is a village located in the municipality of Kraljevo, Serbia. According to the 2011 census, the village has a population of 537 inhabitants.
