= Cerje, Zagreb =

Cerje
- Village
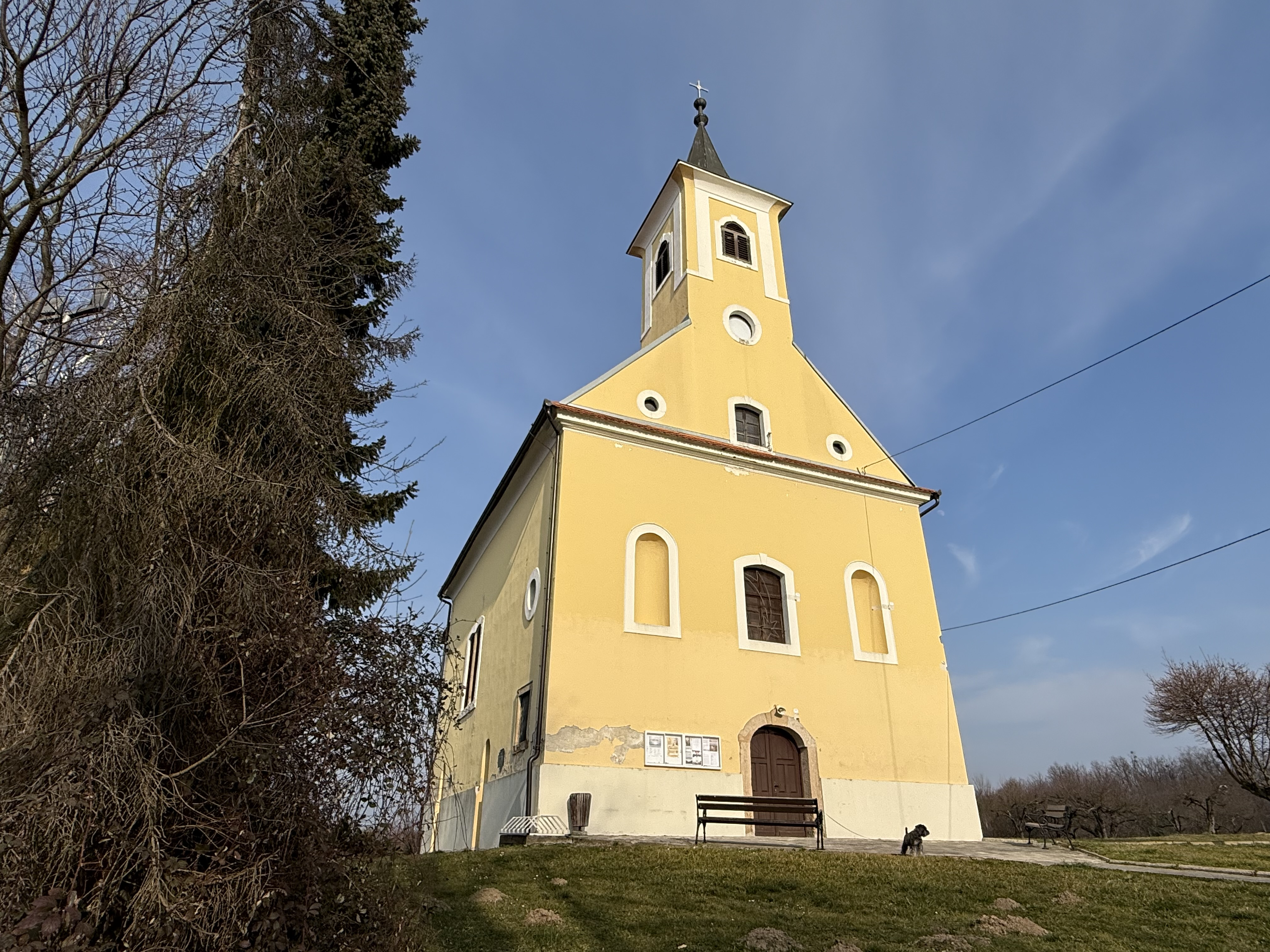
- The Church of Saint John in Cerje

- Location within Croatia
- Coordinates: 45°49′47″N 16°11′29″E
- Country: Croatia
- County: City of Zagreb
- City District: Sesvete

Area
  - Total: 0.46 sq mi (1.2 km^{2})
- Elevation: 541 ft (165 m)

Population (2021)
  - Total: 408
  - Density: 880/sq mi (340/km^{2})
- Time zone: UTC+1 (CET)
  - Summer (DST): UTC+2 (CEST)

Cerje is a village in Croatia. Its name comes from the ancient Croatian word cer — "oak". It is formally a settlement (naselje) of Zagreb, the capital of Croatia.

== Demographics ==
According to the 2021 census, its population was 408. According to the 2011 census, it had 398 inhabitants.
