= Ričice, Travnik =

Ričice
- Village
- Location within Bosnia and Herzegovina
- Coordinates: 44.20989°N 17.7276314°E
- Country: Bosnia and Herzegovina
- Entity: Federation of Bosnia and Herzegovina
- Canton: Central Bosnia
- Municipality: Travnik

Area
  - Total: 0.73 sq mi (1.88 km^{2})

Population (2013)
  - Total: 579
  - Density: 798/sq mi (308/km^{2})
- Time zone: UTC+1 (CET)
  - Summer (DST): UTC+2 (CEST)

Ričice is a village in the municipality of Travnik, Bosnia and Herzegovina.

== Demographics ==
According to the 2013 census, its population was 584.

Ethnicity in 2013
Ethnicity	Number	Percentage
Croats	578	99.0%
Serbs	4	0.7%
other/undeclared	2	0.3%
Total	584	100%
