= Lika-Senj County =

County in Croatia

Coordinates: 44.707°N 15.174°E

Lika-Senj County Ličko-senjska županija (Croatian)
- County
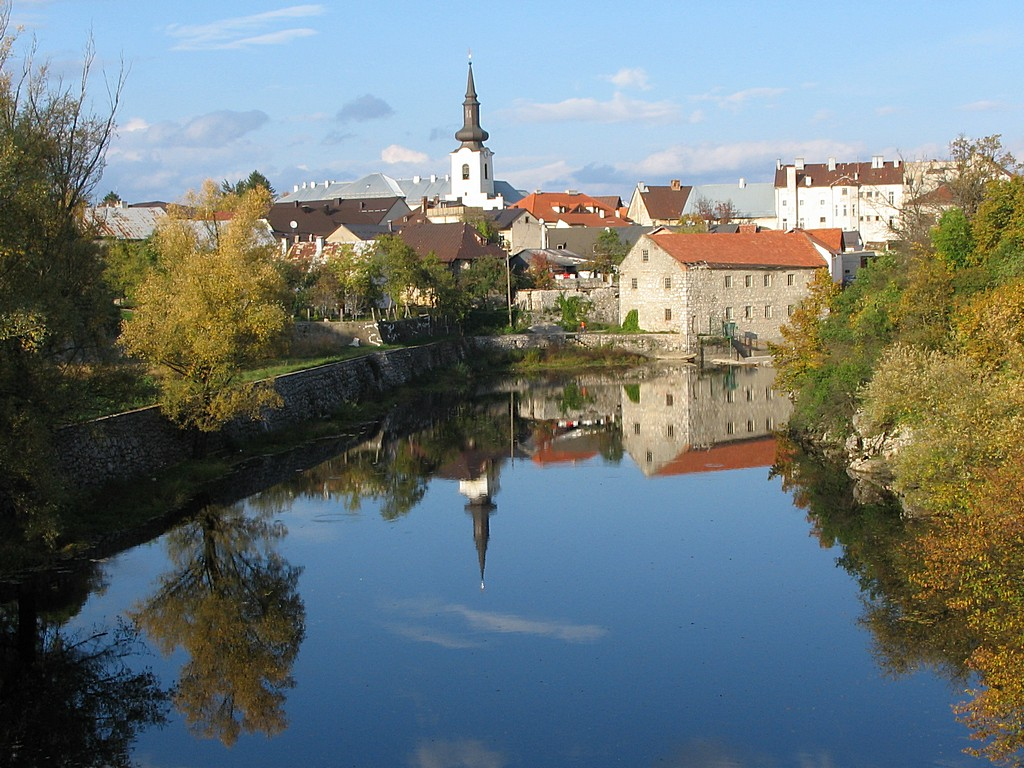
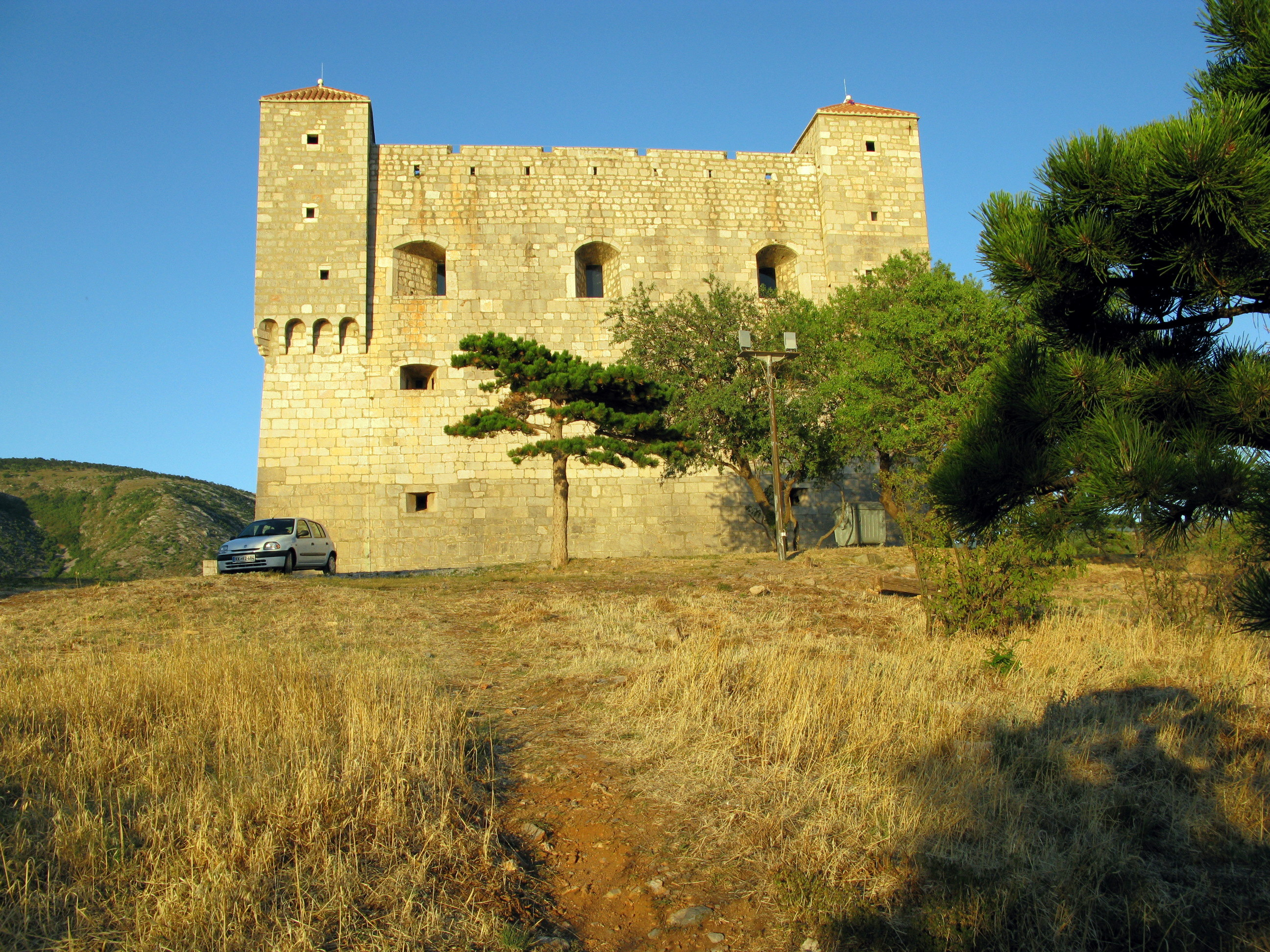
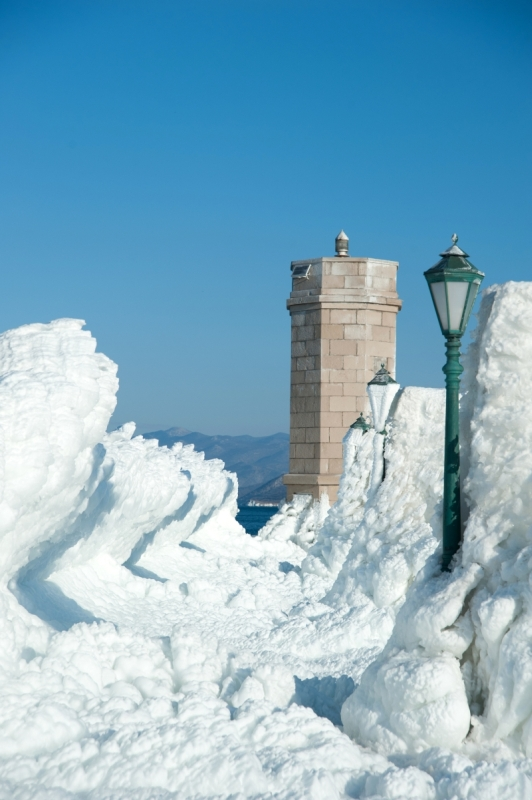
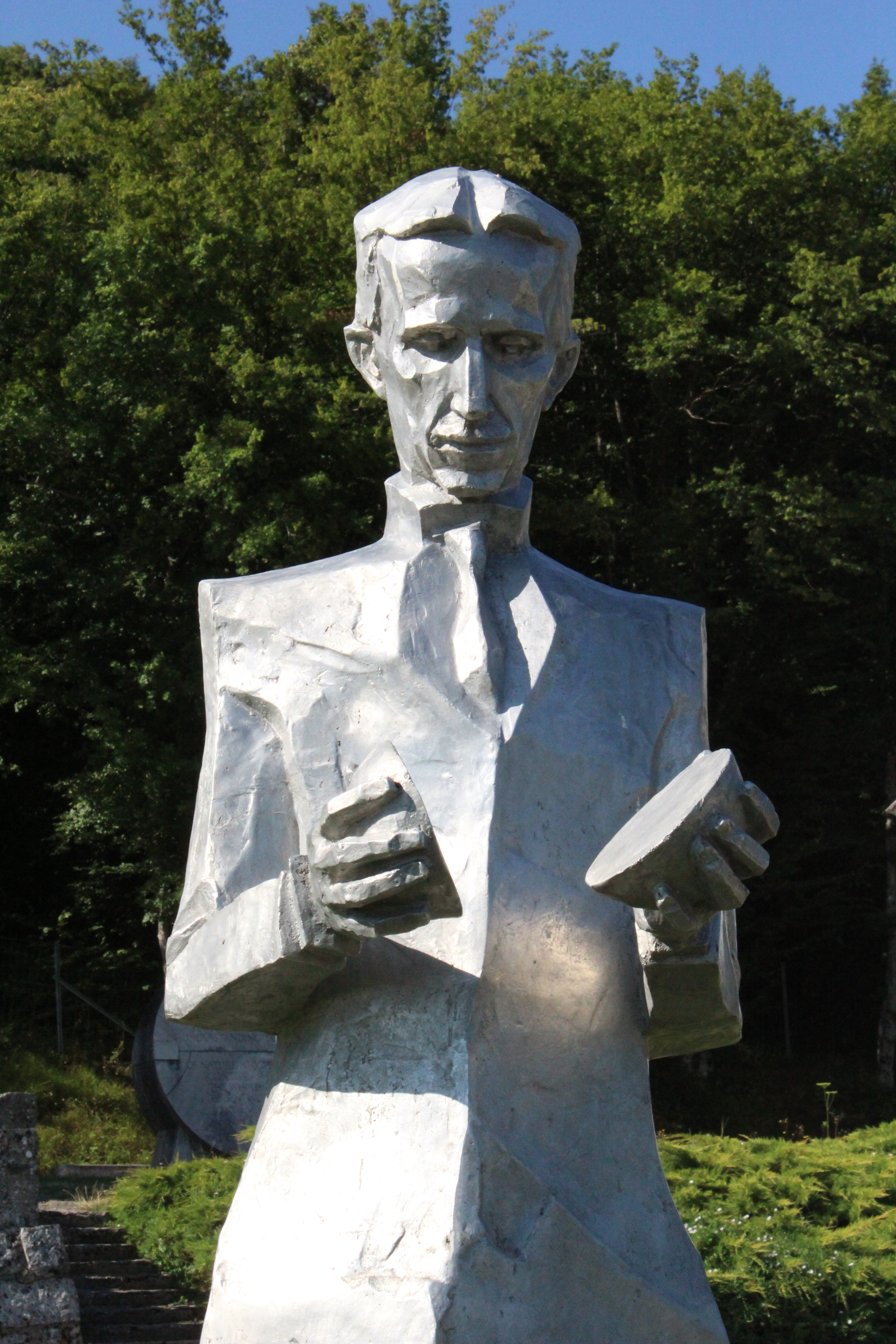
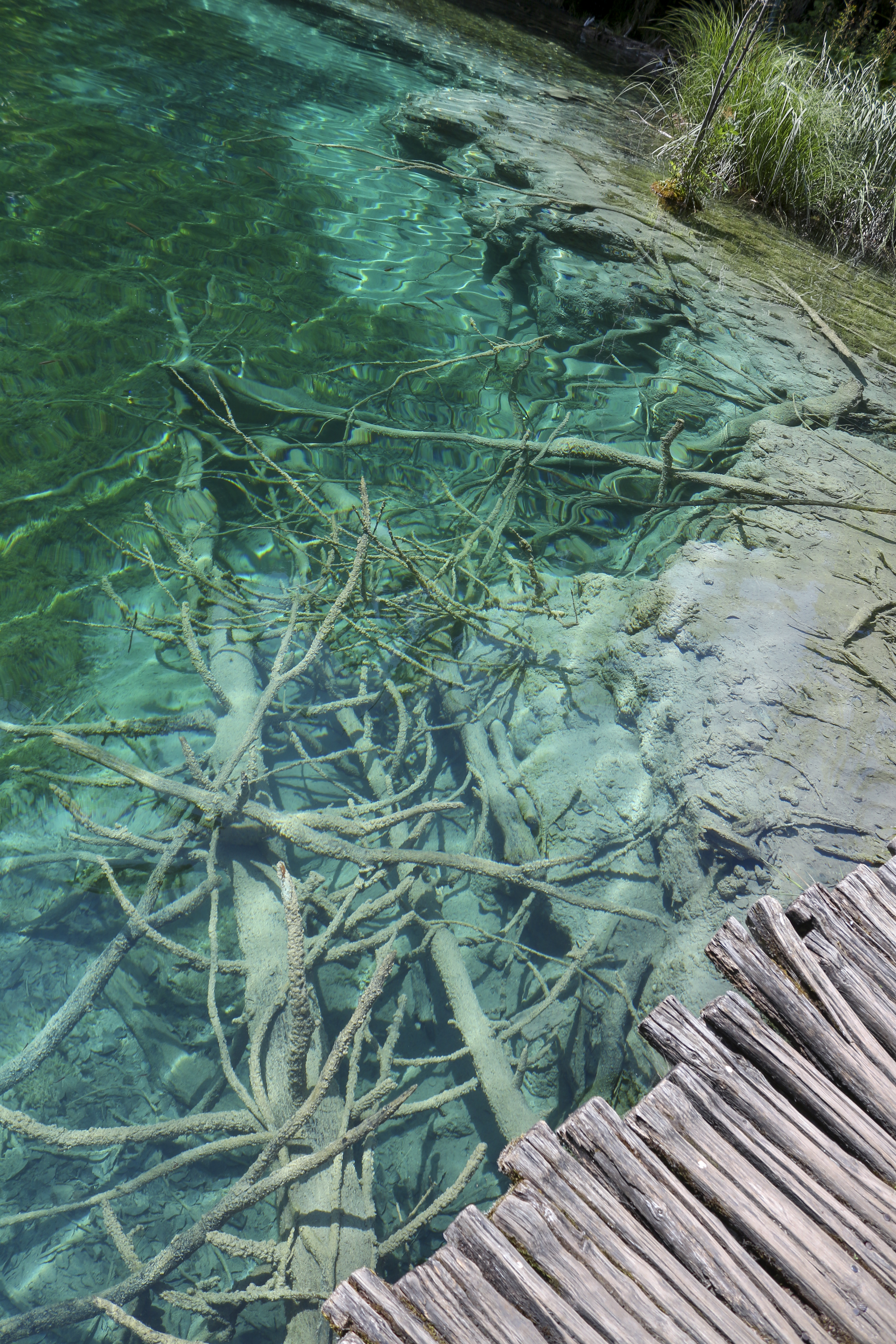
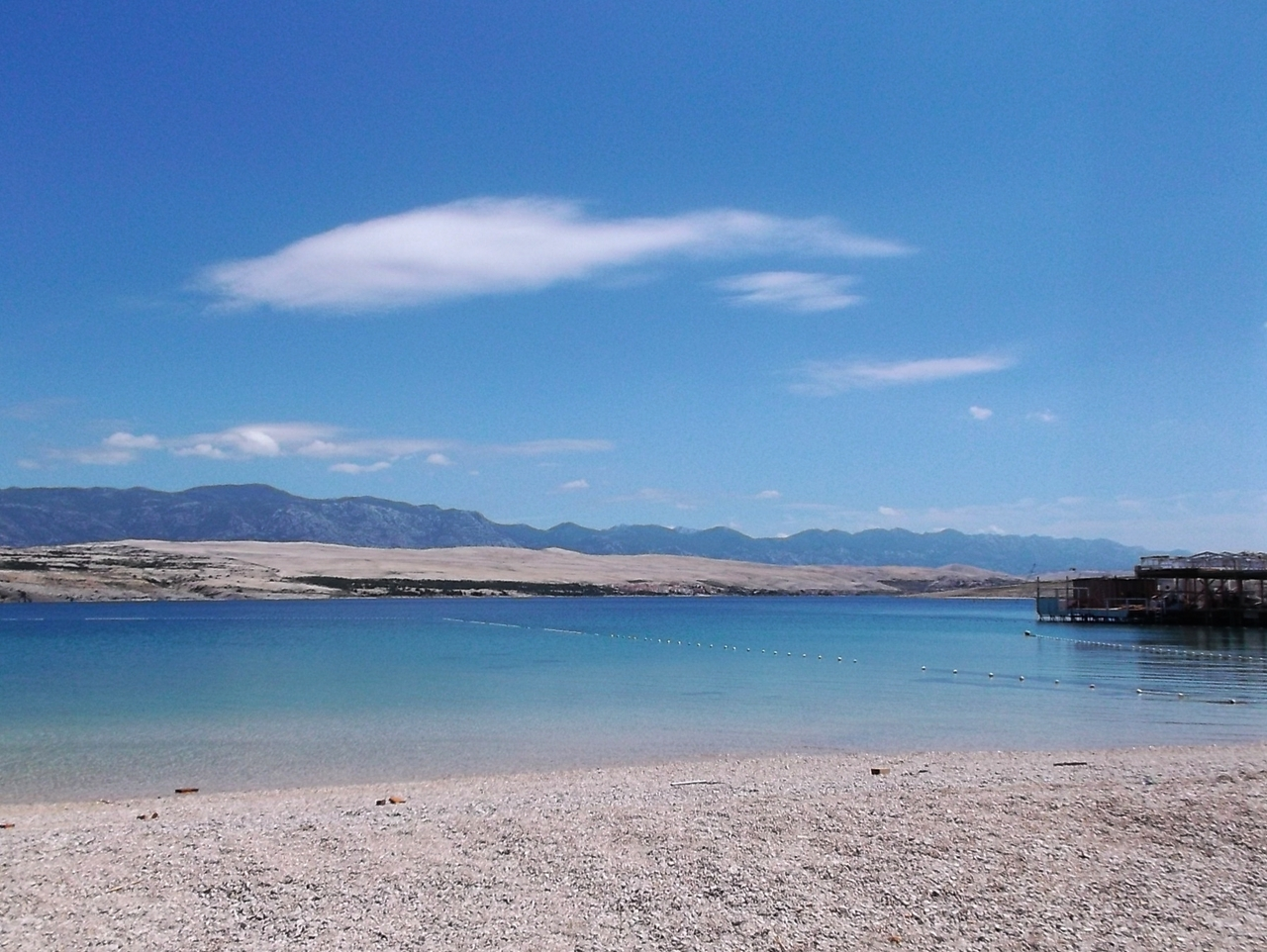
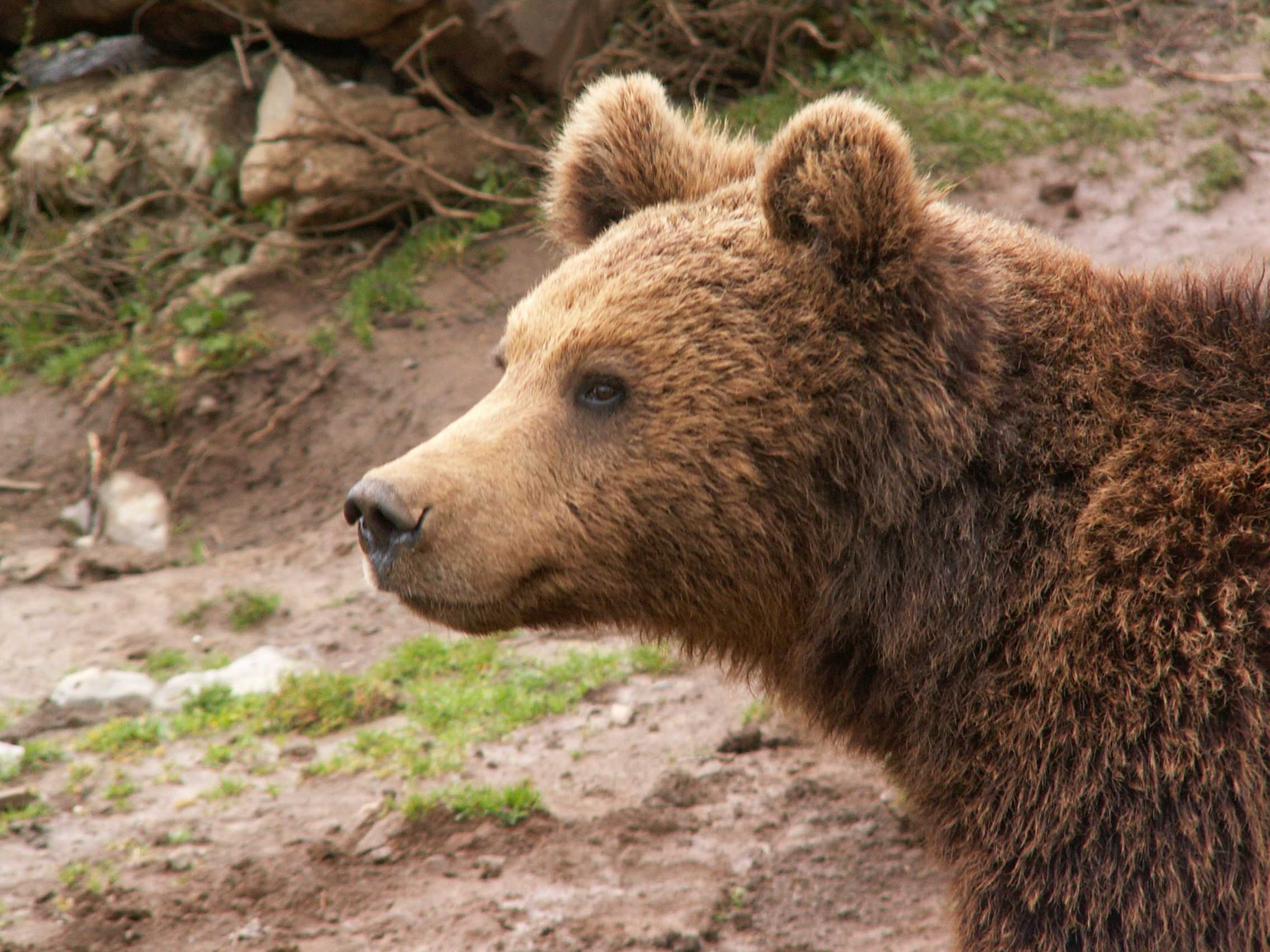
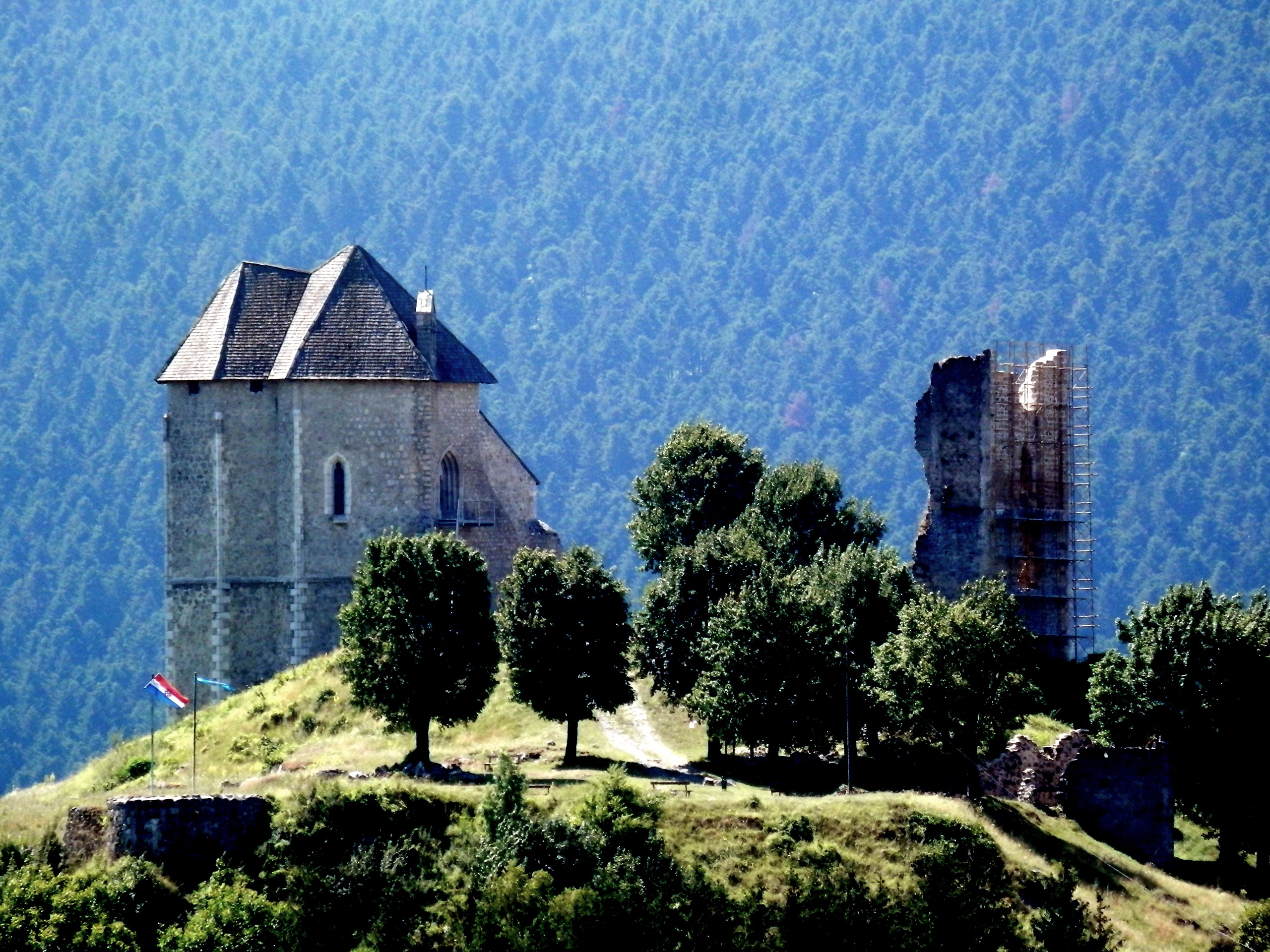
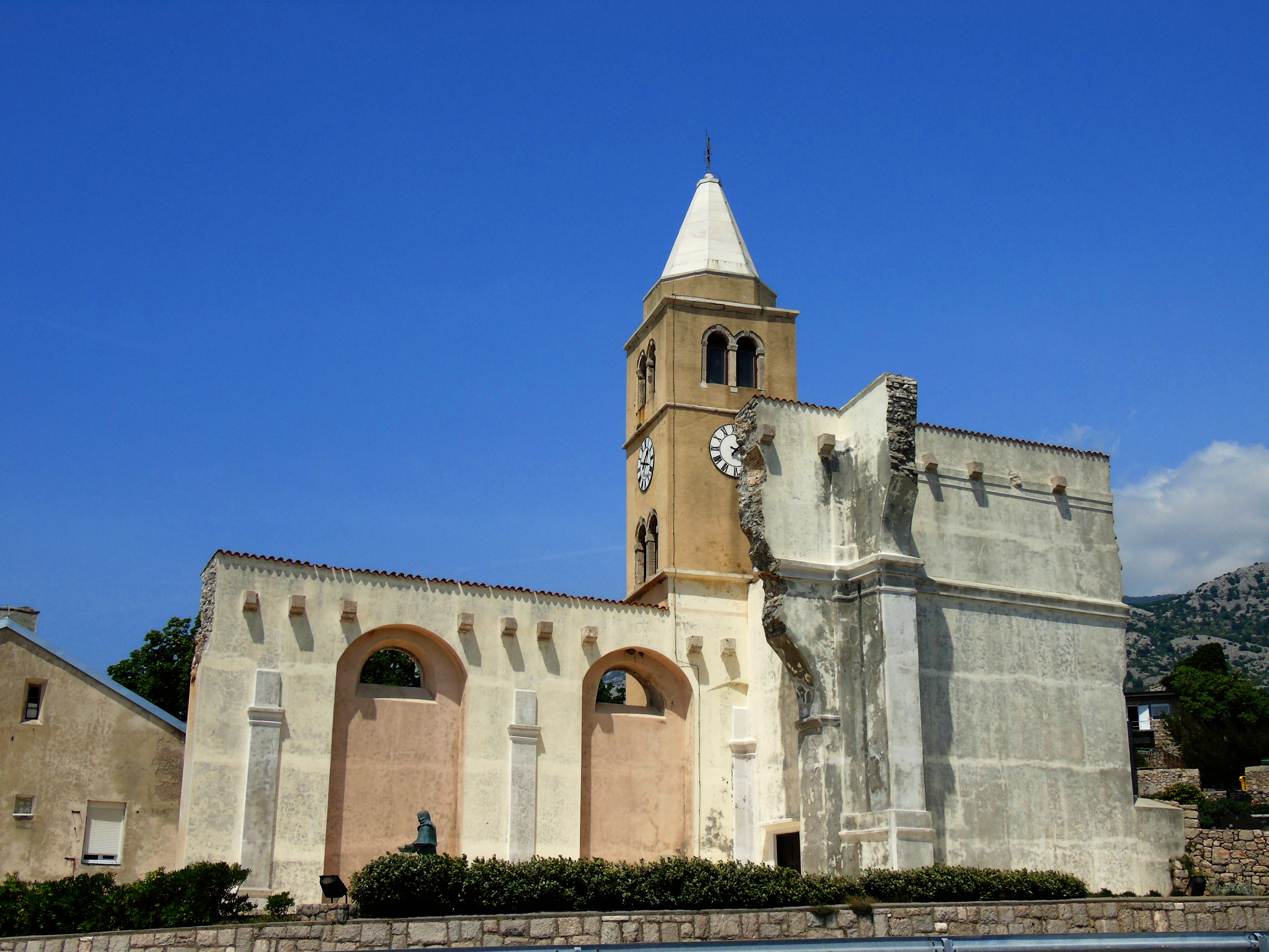

- Flag Coat of arms

- Lika-Senj County within Croatia
- Country: Croatia
- County seat: Gospić

Government
  - Župan (Prefect): Ernest Petry (HDZ)

Area
  - Total: 5,353 km^{2} (2,067 sq mi)

Population (2022)
  - Total: 42,469
  - Density: 7.934/km^{2} (20.55/sq mi)
- Area code: 053
- ISO 3166 code: HR-09
- HDI (2022): 0.842 very high · 15th
- Website: www.licko-senjska.hr

Lika-Senj County (Croatian pronunciation: [lǐːka sɛ̂ːɲ], Croatian: Ličko-senjska županija) is a county in Croatia that includes most of the Lika region and some northern coastline of the Adriatic near the town of Senj, including the northern part of the Pag island. Its center is Gospić.

The county is the least populated (42.469 in 2022) and among the least prosperous ones, though it is the largest county in the country by area and includes the Plitvice Lakes National Park and Sjeverni (North) Velebit National Park, some of Croatia's major tourist attractions.

== Geography ==
The county has a total area of 5353 km^{2}.

== Administrative division ==
Lika-Senj County is administratively subdivided into 12 units of local government:

- Town of Gospić (county seat)
- Town of Novalja
- Town of Otočac
- Town of Senj
- Municipality of Brinje
- Municipality of Donji Lapac
- Municipality of Karlobag
- Municipality of Lovinac
- Municipality of Perušić
- Municipality of Plitvička Jezera (Plitvice Lakes)
- Municipality of Udbina
- Municipality of Vrhovine

== Demographics ==
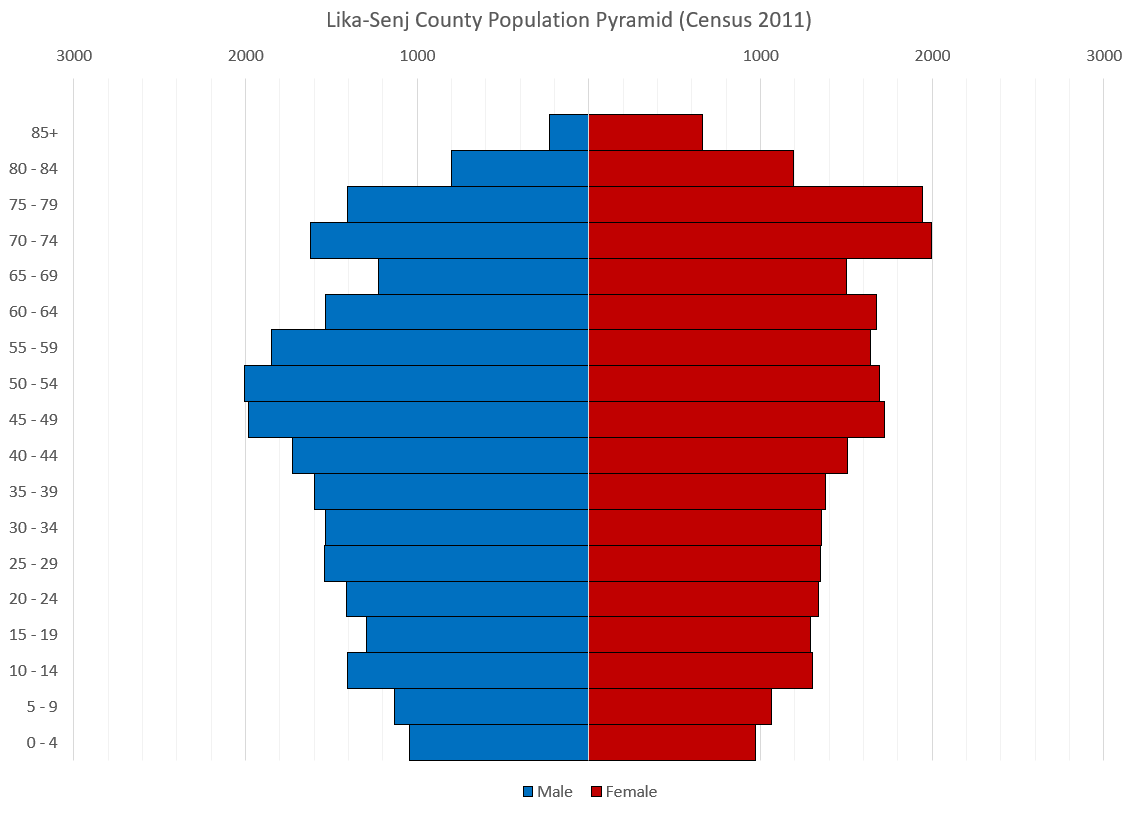
Population pyramid of Lika-Senj County per 2011 Census.

Historical populations of Lika-Senj County

Year	Pop.	±%
1857	155,467	—
1869	165,692	+6.6%
1880	155,382	−6.2%
1890	170,084	+9.5%
1900	186,871	+9.9%
1910	182,392	−2.4%
1921	177,055	−2.9%
1931	172,735	−2.4%
1948	130,855	−24.2%

Year	Pop.	±%
1953	125,677	−4.0%
1961	118,329	−5.8%
1971	106,433	−10.1%
1981	90,836	−14.7%
1991	85,135	−6.3%
2001	53,677	−37.0%
2011	50,927	−5.1%
2021	42,893	−15.8%

Source: Naselja i stanovništvo Republike Hrvatske 1857–2001, Croatian Bureau of Statistics, Zagreb, 2005

Since the early 20th century the county's population has been shrinking. As of the 2021 census, the county had 42.893 residents. As of 2011 census, the county had 50,927 residents. The population density is 9.5/km^{2}.

Croatian State Bureau of Statistics estimated population of the county to stand at 45,493 in 2017, 45,184 in 2018, and 44,625 in 2019.

Lika-Senj County: Population trends 1857–2021
v

population	155467	165692	155382	170084	186871	182392	177055	172735	130855	125677	118329	106433	90836	85135	53677	50927	42893
	1857	1869	1880	1890	1900	1910	1921	1931	1948	1953	1961	1971	1981	1991	2001	2011	2021

Sources: Croatian Bureau of Statistics publications

=== Ethnic composition ===
Ethnic Croats form the majority with 84.15% of the population, followed by Serbs at 13.65%. Serbs form majority in municipalities of Vrhovine, Donji Lapac, and Udbina.

In 1991, before the outbreak of the Croatian War of Independence and the Breakup of Yugoslavia, Croats comprised 59.7% of the population, while Serbs comprised 37%. The area of the county used to have a significant Serb population, mostly located in the eastern part of the county, where they formed a majority. The entire former Lika-Krbava County, loosely overlapping with the area of the modern Lika-Senj county, in censuses of 1900 and 1910 even registered Serb majority (51.2% and 50.8%, respectively).

== County government ==
The current Prefect of Lika-Senj County is Ernest Petry (HDZ).

The county assembly is composed of 27 representatives from the following political parties:

Political party	Seats won	Government
LiPO	9 / 27	Opposition
Croatian Democratic Union	6 / 27	Government
Croatian Party of Rights	5 / 27	Government
Croatian Peasant Party	2 / 27	Government
Croatian Party of Pensioners	1 / 27	Government
Independent Democratic Serb Party	1 / 27	Opposition
Croatian Bunjevac Party	1 / 27	Government
Homeland Movement	1 / 27	Opposition
Social Democratic Party of Croatia	1 / 27	Opposition

=== Minority councils and representatives ===
Directly elected minority councils and representatives are tasked with consulting tasks for the local or regional authorities in which they are advocating for minority rights and interests, integration into public life and participation in the management of local affairs. At the 2023 Croatian national minorities councils and representatives elections Serbs of Croatia fulfilled legal requirements to elect 25 members minority council of the Lika-Senj County while Albanians and Bosniaks of Croatia fulfilled requirements to elect individual representative but with both representatives remaining unelected due to the absence of candidatures. Some municipalities and towns in the county elected their own local minority councils as well.

== See also ==
- Lika-Krbava County of the Kingdom of Croatia-Slavonia
- Morlachia, an historical region in Europe largely located in the modern Lika-Senj County
