= Lužnica Manor =

Baroque building in Zaprešić, Croatia

Lužnica Castle
- Dvorac Lužnica (Croatian)
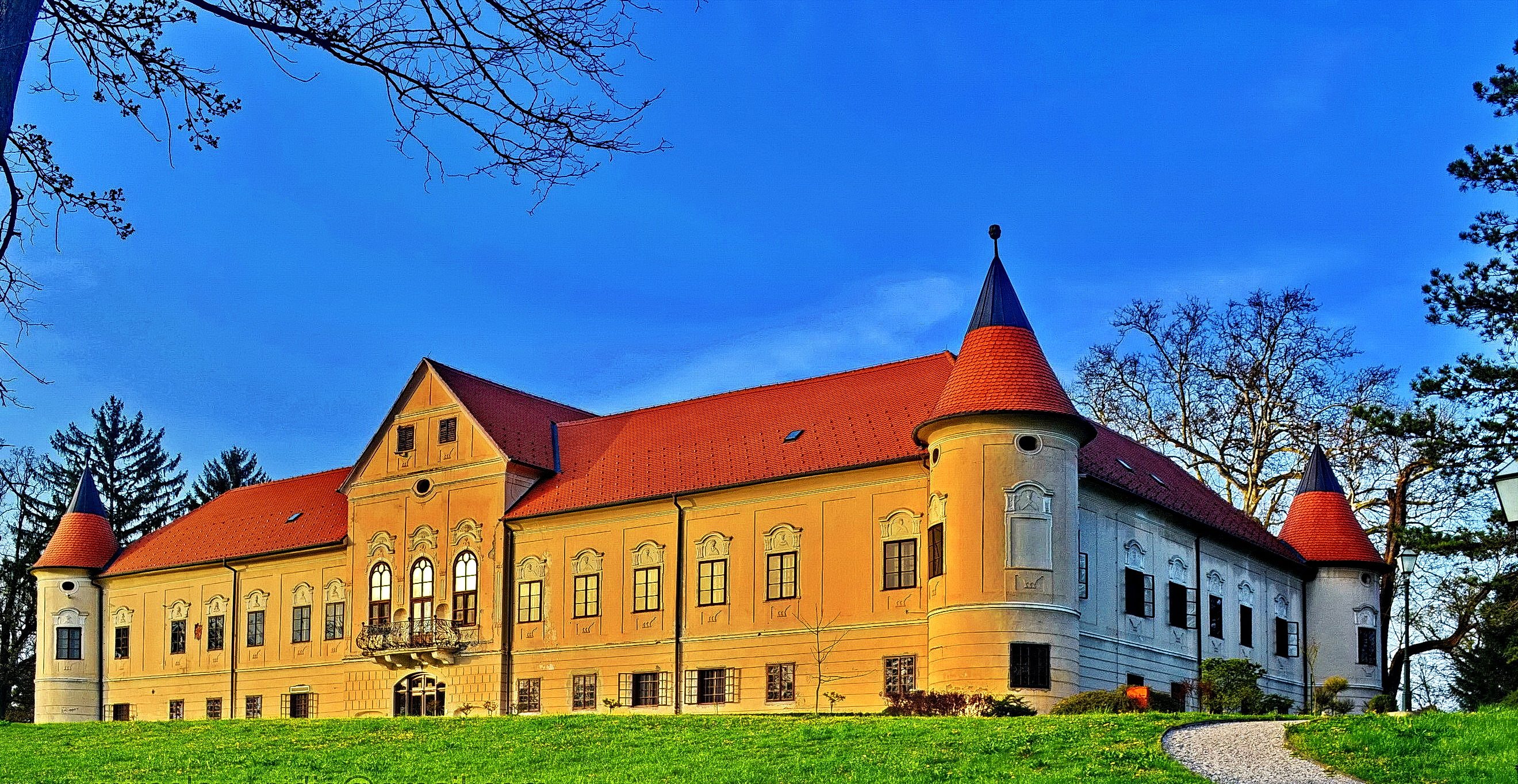
- Castle as seen from its southern side

- Location within Croatia
- Interactive map of Lužnica Castle
- 45°52′04″N 15°46′45″E
- Location: Near Zaprešić, Croatia

History
- Built: early 18th century

Site notes
- Area: 8 ha (20 acres)
- Architectural style: Baroque
- Governing body: Daughters of Charity of Saint Vincent de Paul

Cultural Good of Croatia
- Type: Protected cultural good
- Reference no.: Z-2789

Lužnica Castle (Croatian: Dvorac Lužnica) is a baroque manor in Lužnica, Croatia, a suburban settlement of Zaprešić. Built in the second half of the 18th century, it is an example of the multi-wing open-plan manor typical of Hrvatsko Zagorje. It is protected as a cultural good of the Republic of Croatia, and is owned by the Sisters of Charity of Saint Vincent de Paul, whose sisters run the Marijin Dvor spiritual-educational centre housed within it.

== History ==
It is believed that the Castle was built at the beginning of the 18th century. Since 1791 the estate was the owned by von Rauch noble family. They soon had the Castle renovated and further expanded. At the end of 19th century, Marija Jurić Zagorka, lived in the Castle from the age of 3 until 10 years, as her father was estate manager for the von Rauch family. She later became one of the most prominent Croatian writers of her time. Countess Antonija noticed the talent of young Zagorka, so she made possible for her to use the castle library and attend private schooling lessons along her own kids. In 1923, Geza, the final member of Rauch family was killed under suspicious circumstances. Following his death, his widow Antonija, sold Lužnica, which then became property of Daughters of Charity of Saint Vincent de Paul.

At a time, this order was looking for a large estate close to capital, Zagreb, for sixty of its members. One part of the manor was soon turned into a hospital, another part into a chapel, while surrounding land was used for agriculture. The goods from the estate were shipped to a Sisters of Charity Hospital in Zagreb. At the beginning of the 20th century, the manor was also used as a kindergarten, music and householding school for the local community.

== See also ==
- Novi Dvori
- Susedgrad
- Januševec Castle

== Literature ==
- Obad Šćitaroci, Mladen; Bojanić Obad Šćitaroci, Bojana; Dundović, Boris (2013). "Manors and Gardens in Northern Croatia in the Age of Historicism" (PDF). Centropa. pp. 175–186. ISSN 1532-5563.
