= Pojatno =

- Location within Croatia
- Coordinates: 45°54′N 15°48′E
- Country: Croatia
- County: Zagreb County
- City: Zaprešić

Area
  - Total: 5.6 km^{2} (2.2 sq mi)

Population (2021)
  - Total: 1,154
  - Density: 210/km^{2} (530/sq mi)
- Time zone: UTC+1 (CET)
  - Summer (DST): UTC+2 (CEST)

Pojatno is a census-designated naselje (settlement) in the town of Zaprešić in Zagreb County, Croatia. It has a population of 1,157 people, living mainly by the main street, "Matije Gupca". Pojatno is located north of Zaprešić, 25 km (16 mi) away from Zagreb, near the Krapina River. The settlement is spread over an area of 5.37 square kilometers (2.07 sq mi).

Pojatno has good transport connections with Zagreb, Krapina, and Zaprešić.
