= Zaprešić =

Town in Zagreb County, Croatia

- Town
- Grad Zaprešić; Town of Zaprešić
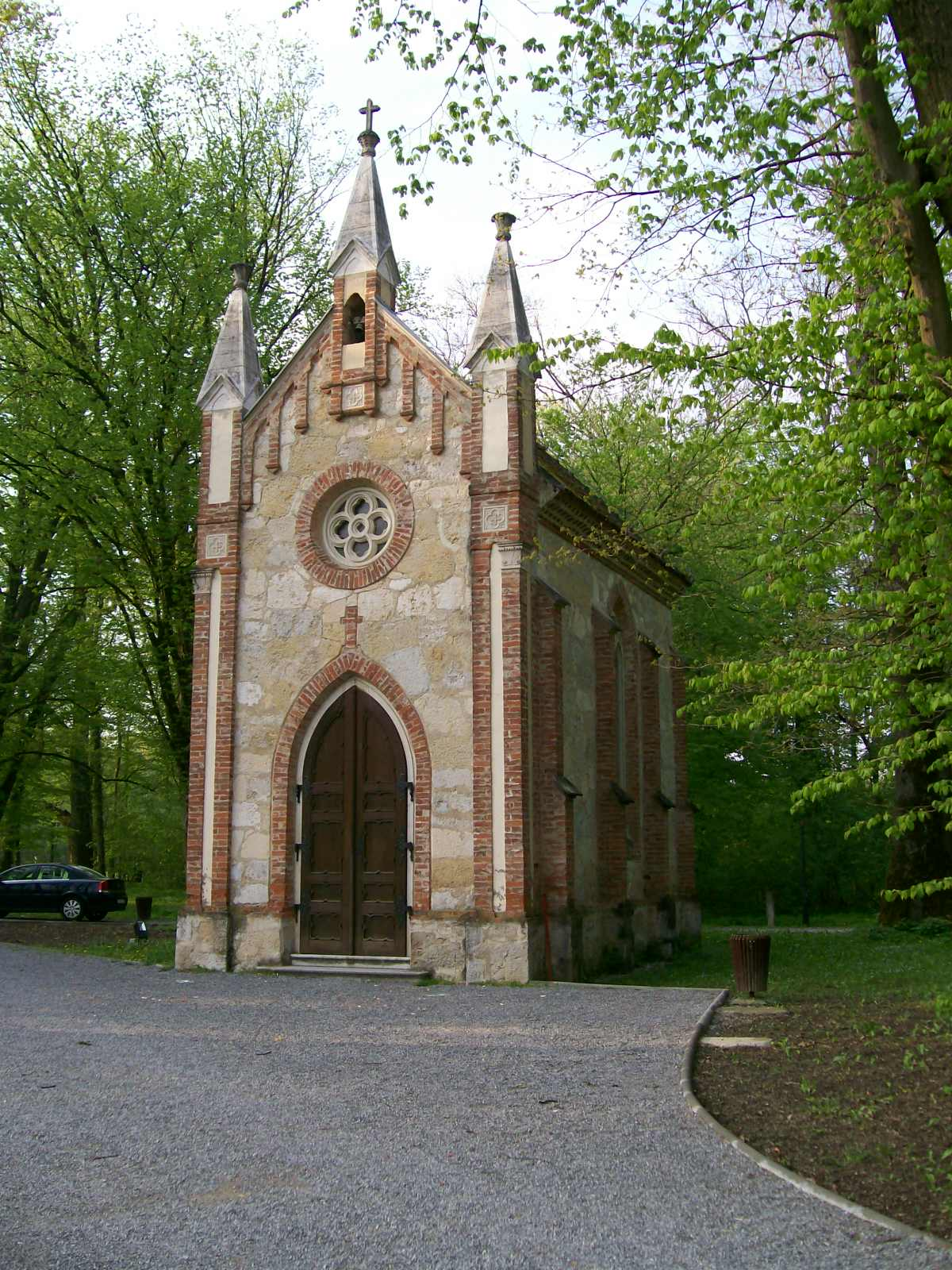
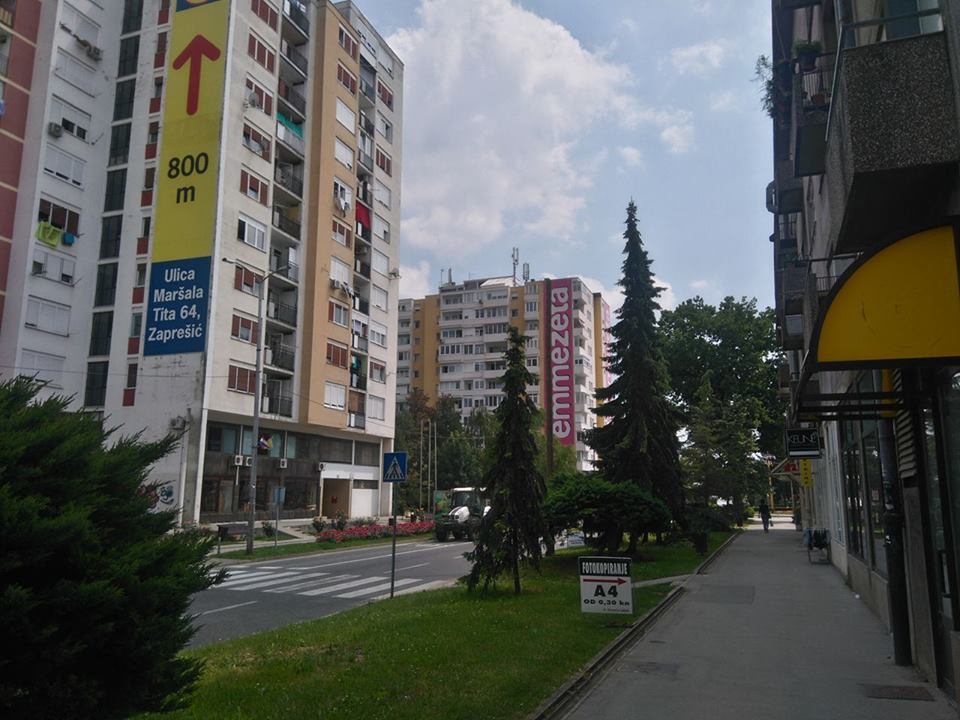
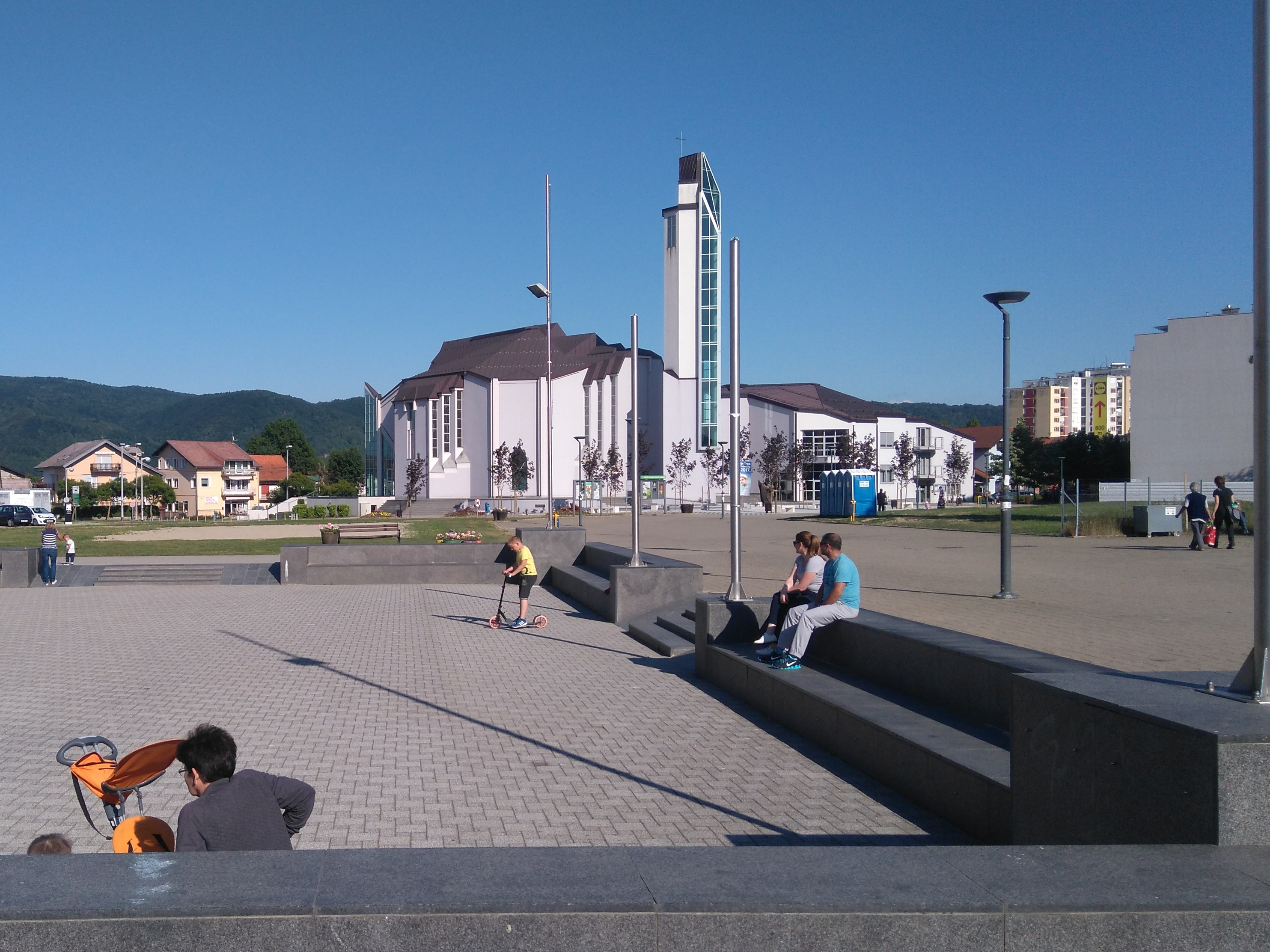
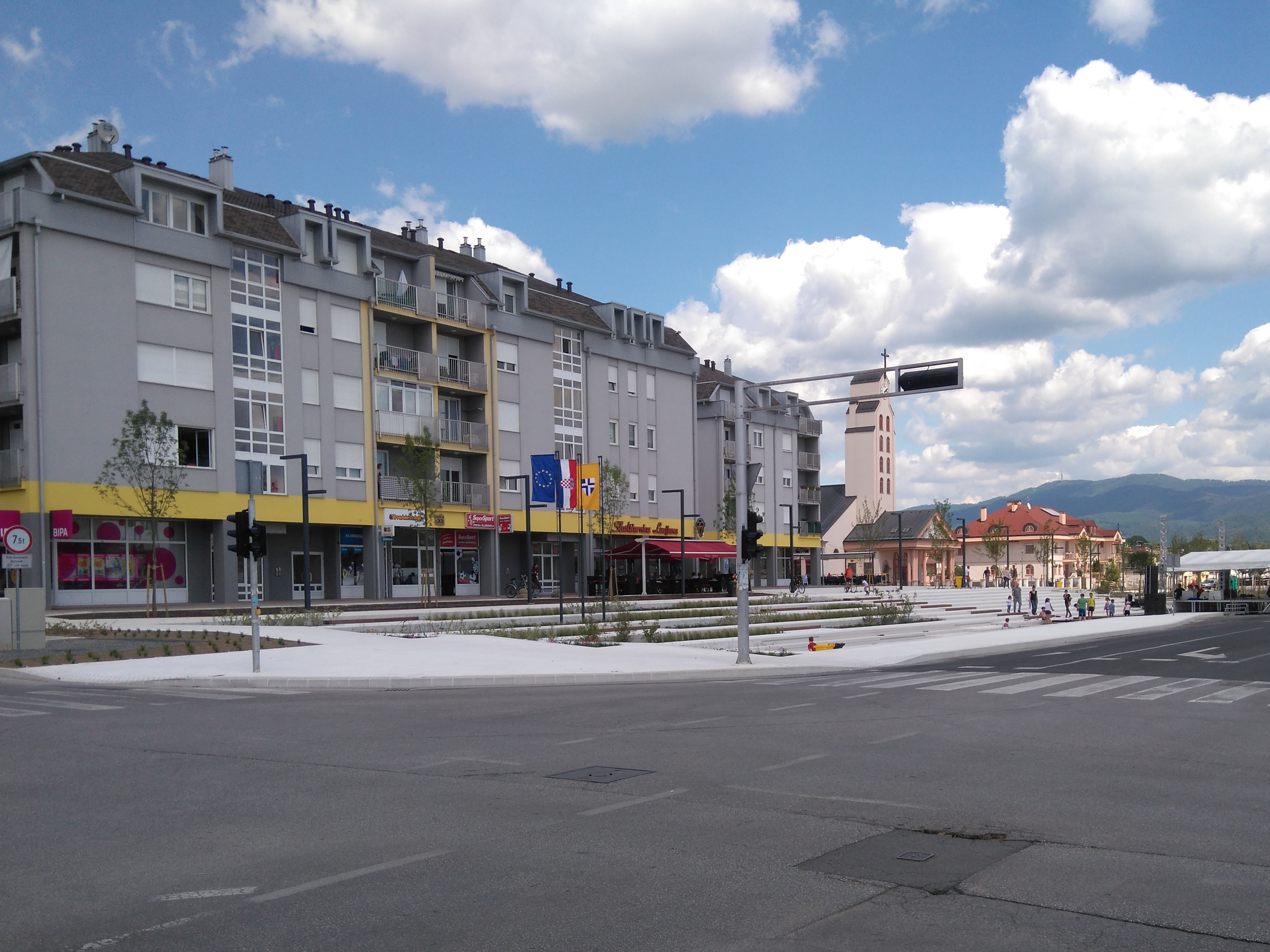
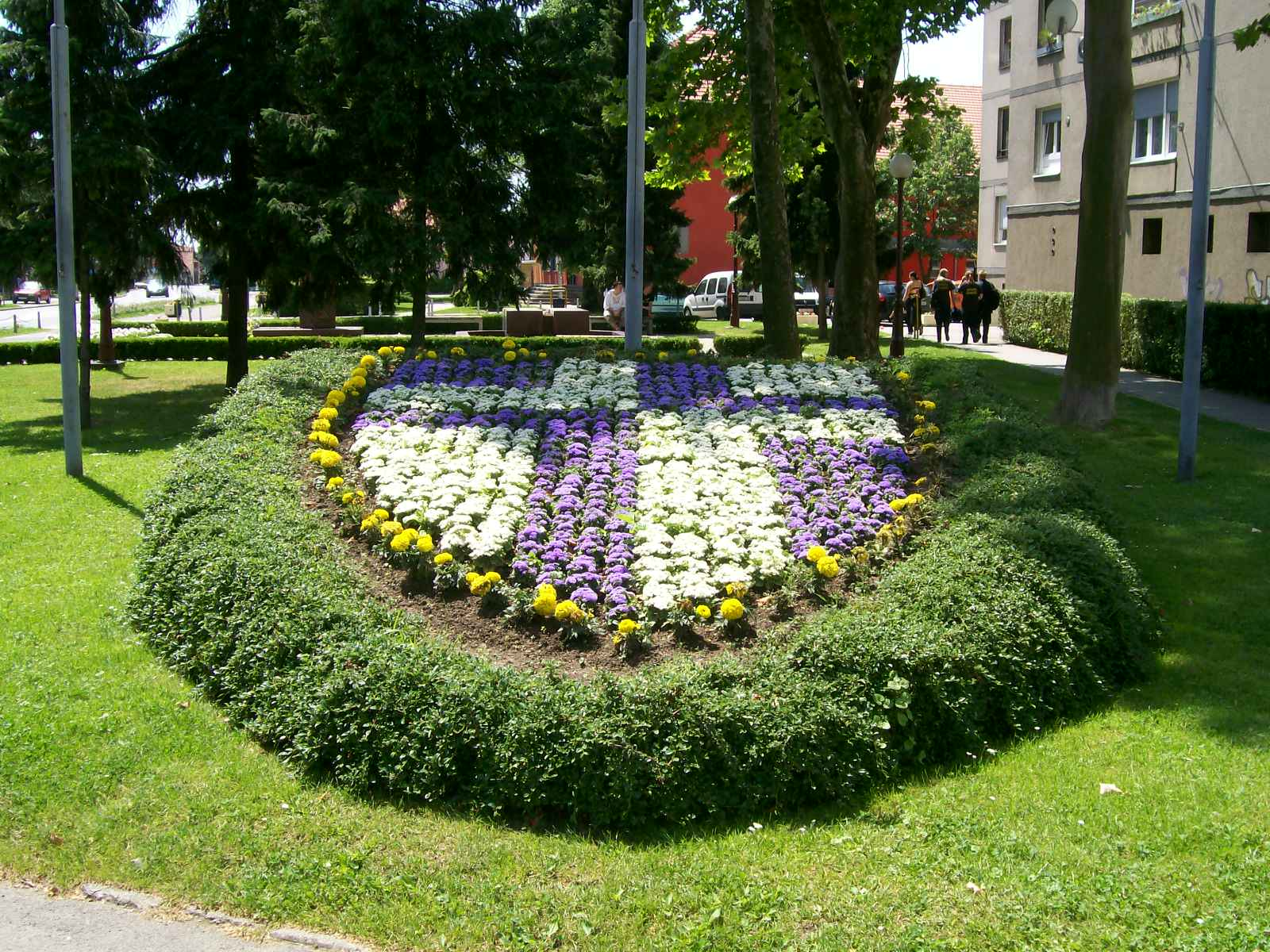
- Top: A gothic chapel in Novi Dvori; Center left: High-rise buildings in city centre; Center right: Square of Pope John Paul II; Bottom left: Franjo Tuđman Square; Bottom right: Zaprešić coat of arms shaped garden in city centre

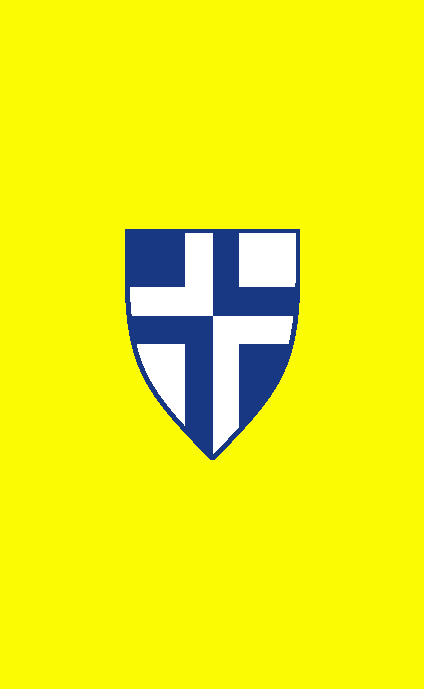
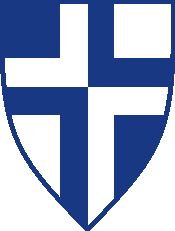
- Flag Coat of arms
- Interactive map of Zaprešić
- Location of Zaprešić in Croatia
- Coordinates: 45°51′26″N 15°48′18″E
- Country: Croatia
- Region: Central Croatia (Hrvatsko Zagorje)
- County: Zagreb County
- Parish church: 1334
- Municipality: 1952
- Incorporated: 30 November 1995
- Settlements: 9 settlements: 1. Hruševec Kupljenski; 2. Ivanec Bistranski; 3. Jablanovec; 4. Kupljenovo; 5. Lužnica; 6. Merenje; 7. Pojatno; 8. Šibice; 9. Zaprešić

Government
  - Type: Mayor-council
  - Mayor: Željko Turk (HDZ)
  - City Council: 19 members: • DP, Most, PD (6); • HDZ (6); • SDP (4); • FOKUS (2); • NZ (1)

Area
  - Town: 53.8 km^{2} (20.8 sq mi)
  - Urban: 19.0 km^{2} (7.3 sq mi)
  - Metro: 251.25 km^{2} (97.01 sq mi)
- Highest elevation: 130 m (430 ft)

Population (2021)
  - Town: 24,133
  - Density: 449/km^{2} (1,160/sq mi)
  - Urban: 18,768
  - Urban density: 988/km^{2} (2,560/sq mi)
- Time zone: UTC+1 (CET)
  - Summer (DST): UTC+2 (CEST)
- Postal codes: HR-10 290
- Area code: +385 1
- Vehicle registration: ZG
- Website: zapresic.hr

Zaprešić (pronounced [zâːpreʃitɕ]) is a town in Zagreb County, in central Croatia. It has a population of 19,644 inhabitants in the town proper, with 25,223 in the administrative area. The town's metropolitan area, which encompasses the seven neighbouring municipalities, has a population of 54,640. Zaprešić is the third-largest, and most densely populated town of the county. (Note: This is calculated on the basis of second-level administrative divisions (towns, and municipalities), not the census-designated settlements (naselja). When calculated on the basis of settlements, Zaprešić is the second-largest one, after Velika Gorica with 31,553 inhabitants (2011 census).) It is located northwest of the Croatian capital Zagreb, and near the Slovenian border. It is centered on plains north of the Sava River, and is bordered by Medvednica Mountain to the east, and the Marija Gorica Hills to the west.

The first human settlement in, and near Zaprešić dates from the Neolithic, and several Roman roads were constructed in the area. Vicinity to transport corridors is also reflected in the meaning of the name (za, 'near or behind', prešće 'crossing'). The first records of the settlement date from 1474, although, some authors claim that the church of Saint Peter in Zaprešić could have been mentioned in a document supposedly written in 1334. In the late medieval and early modern times, the village history includes being a part of a feudal estate Susedgrad, as well of being a part of Brdovec parish.

During the 19th century the town was operating the first meat packaging plant in Croatia. However, it was not formally established as a town until 1995. The town is governed by a mayor, a town government of seven members (upper house), and a town council of twenty-one (lower house). Zaprešić has its own fire department, but police coverage is provided by the City of Zagreb. Komunalno poduzeće Zaprešić manages all utilities except electricity. Tap water in Zaprešić is of high quality.

Due to its many rail, and road transport corridors, Zaprešić has been dubbed the "northwestern gate to Zagreb County". It lies directly next to the A2 highway connecting Zagreb to Central Europe. It also is adjacent to the main railway leading northwest out of Zagreb. Centered on the tertiary sector, the town's economy is booming due to a large population influx.

Zaprešić's educational facilities range from kindergartens to centers of higher education. The town is home to four elementary schools, one high school, and two universities. The Zaprešić metropolitan area contains six castles that together make up what is known as the "palace path." The town also has a museum and an art gallery. The most popular sport in the region is football, and the local team was NK Inter Zaprešić, that used to be a member of the First Football League of Croatia. Other sports are also present in Zaprešić, and the town is home to a golf resort.

== History ==
The first records of human inhabitants in area of what is today Zaprešić can be traced back to the Neolithic, which can be seen by stone axes found in nearby Brdovec, and axes from the Copper Age found in Marija Gorica. Hallstatt culture traces were also uncovered in the area of Sveti Križ. The Romans left their imprints on nearby in the form of the Siscia–Neviodunum–Emona road, which followed Sava River on its left bank through area of what is today Zaprešić, passing near modern settlements.

After a lack of records from the first millennium, Zaprešić was mentioned in written sources in the late 11th century. In 1094, following the formation of the Zagreb Diocese, magnate called Aka, an advisor of the Hungarian-Croatian King Ladislav I, was granted land west and east of the Medvednica Mountain in order to protect the newly formed diocese.

=== Susedgrad-Stubica Seigniory ===
In the 14th century, the area between rivers Krapina and Sutla (where today Zaprešić is located) was under control of ban of Slavonia. Multiple historical sources refer to this part of land as Zakrapina (probably due to it being behind Krapina river in relation to Susedgrad Castle). Zaprešić became part of the Susedgrad–Stubica Seigniory, centered around Susedgrad Castle westernmost banks of Medvednica. The seigniory was at a time a second-largest estate in the Zagreb County. In 1334, the parish church of St. Peter was founded in Zaprešić, marking the first evidence of the modern settlement of Zaprešić. The settlement developed rapidly, which is attributed to its position on trade and transit routes.

During the 15th and 16th centuries, refugees from Lika came to Zaprešić while fleeng the Croatian-Ottoman Wars. Some of these refugees were the so-called Brdovec Franciscans, for whom Lord Zylagy of Susedgrad built an abbey in Marija Gorica. The refugees brought along their Ikavian accent, which was preserved for a long time in some small Zaprešić communities, although the Zaprešić area has historically been Ekavian Kajkavian (yat being [e] or [ɛ] rather than [i]). The area of Zaprešić and nearby vicinity in the 16th century was known for its vineyards and wine production. The area serfs from Zaprešić and nearby villages took part in famous Peasant revolt of 1573, led by Ambroz Gubec, with some of the serf leaders being from Zaprešić area. Ivan Kukuljević Sakcinski, for one thinks that Ambroz Gubec himself managed the estate of Jablanovec, part of modern Zaprešić. Another revolt leader was Ilija Gregorić, a resident of Marija Gorica. Another serf captain was Ivan Turković from Zaprešić.

Two years later, the large Susedgrad-Stubica Seigniory started to disintegrate into many small estates owned by members of lower nobility. Dozens of simple diocesan curia houses remained as a consequence of this.

=== Contemporary history ===
In 1862, one of the first railway lines in Croatia: Zidani Most-Zagreb-Sisak - was constructed, and it passed through Zaprešić on its way to Zagreb.

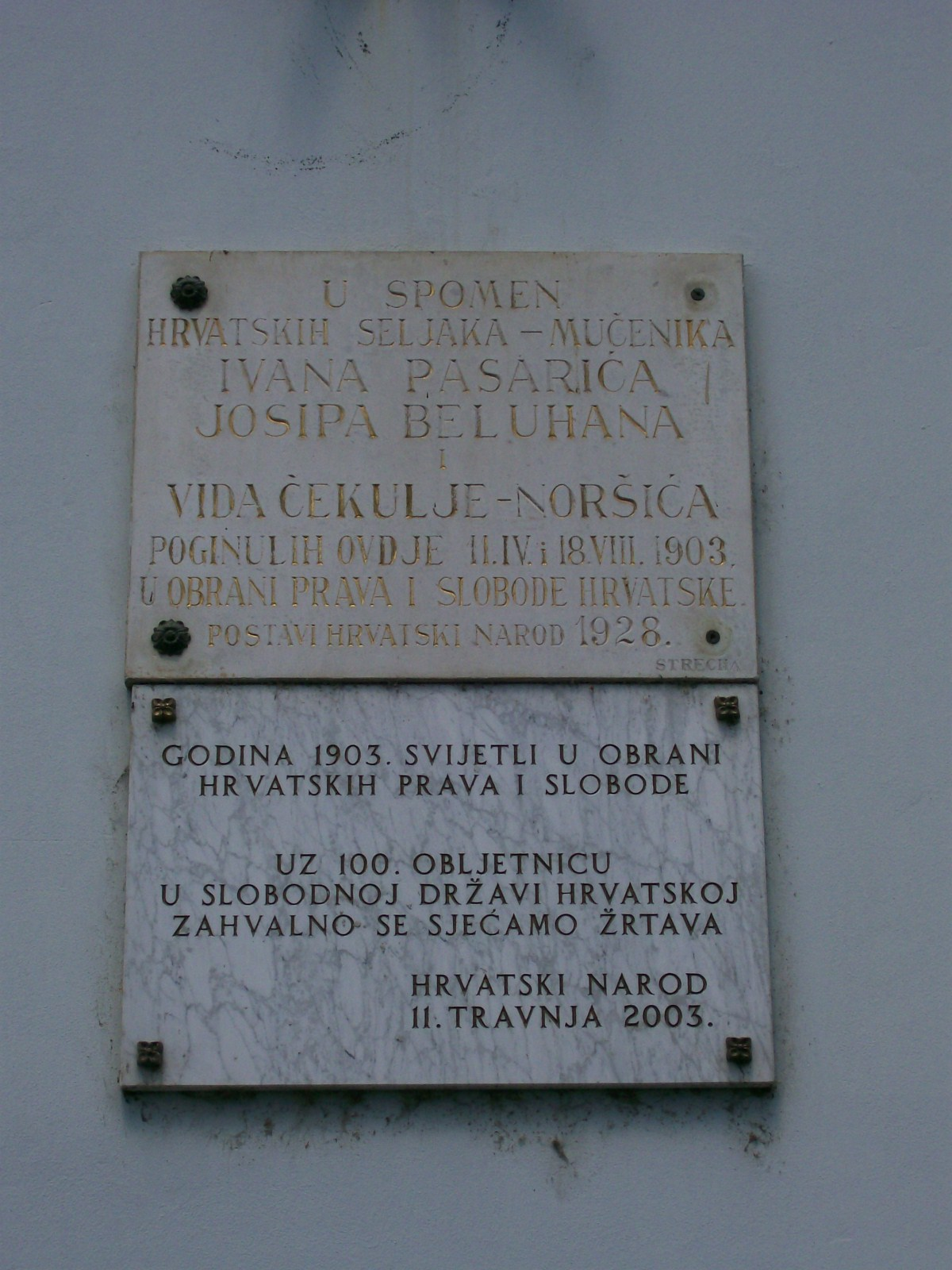
Memorial panels on Zaprešić railway station building dedicated to martyrdom of local peasants in 1903.

In 1903, Zaprešić railway station was a hotspot of two anti-Hungarian riots caused by Khuen Hedervary's magyarization policy and breaking of Croatian–Hungarian Settlement of 1868 by installing Hungarian national symbols on railway objects across Croatia. These demonstrations were part of a wider national movement that swept the country at a time. In both occasions the demonstrations turned into a scuffle with local gendarmes which ended up with several peasants killed and dozens of locals arrested. Peasants that were killed or injured by the gendarmes are traditionally celebrated as a heroes and national martyrs. In their honour, two separate memorial boards were placed on the building of Zaprešić railway station in 1928. and 2003. After the First World War, the oldest meat industry in Croatia, the Industrija mesnih proizvoda, was founded.

Zaprešić was formally established for the first time in 1952, when the Municipality of Zaprešić (Croatian: Općina Zaprešić) was formed. The municipality operated as part of the Zagreb kotar and later City of Zagreb. The Town of Zaprešić (Grad Zaprešić) was incorporated on 30 November 1995. On that day, parts of the surrounding municipalities of Pušća, and Hruševec Kupljenski (which was disbanded, leaving only a namesake settlement) and the City of Zagreb were incorporated into a new Town of Zaprešić. (Note: Namely, Pojatno was taken from Pušća, and the settlements of Hruševec Kupljenski, and Kupljenovo from the Municipality of Hruševec Kupljenski. Settlements taken from the City of Zagreb were Ivanec Bistranski, Jablanovec, Lužnica, Šibice, and Zaprešić. Merenje was assigned to the Luka municipality. Compare NN 69/95: Act of Zagreb County with NN 90/92: Act of coverage of counties, cities and municipalities in the Republic of Croatia (1992), and NN 90/92: Act of the City of Zagreb for a full list of Zagreb County settlements by municipality or town in 1995.) The settlement of Merenje came under the jurisdiction of Zaprešić on 17 January 1997.

== Geography ==
Zaprešić is a part of the metropolitan area of Croatia's capital and largest city, Zagreb. It is located 18 kilometres (11 mi) northwest of Zagreb, lying near the confluence of the Krapina River, and the Sava River. The small Lužnica River marks the western border of Zaprešić. The Zaprešić metropolitan area consists of Zaprešić and seven surrounding municipalities: Bistra, Brdovec, Dubravica, Jakovlje, Luka, Marija Gorica, and Pušća. It is located in the northwestern part of Zagreb County, bordered on the south by the Sava River, on the east by Zagreb and the Medvednica Mountain, and on the west by the Sutla River and the Slovenian border. According to the official website, three distinct geographic areas make up the Zaprešić area: the western part of the Medvednica Mountain, the Marija Gorica Hills and the plains that lie between. The western part of the Medvednica Mountain is fairly lightly inhabited, with no settlements except at the base of the mountain. These include the Bistra municipality and the Zaprešić settlement of Jablanovec. The Marija Gorica Hills are located mainly in the Marija Gorica municipality between the rivers of Krapina, and Sutla. The third area, the plains, is the area where the Zaprešić itself is located. Zaprešić has a lake, Lake Zajarki, situated between the town and the river Sava in the south. It is colloquially known as Bager (Croatian word for excavator). The lake is currently still used as a gravel pit, although it is a known destination for Zaprešić swimmers and beach goers, as well as local people and foreign tourists who do recreational fishing. Fishing activities on lake Zajarki are regulated by Šrd Šaran, Zaprešić. In 2017. the picnic zone was built on eastern side of a big lake which includes barbecue houses and beach volleyball, handball and football fields.

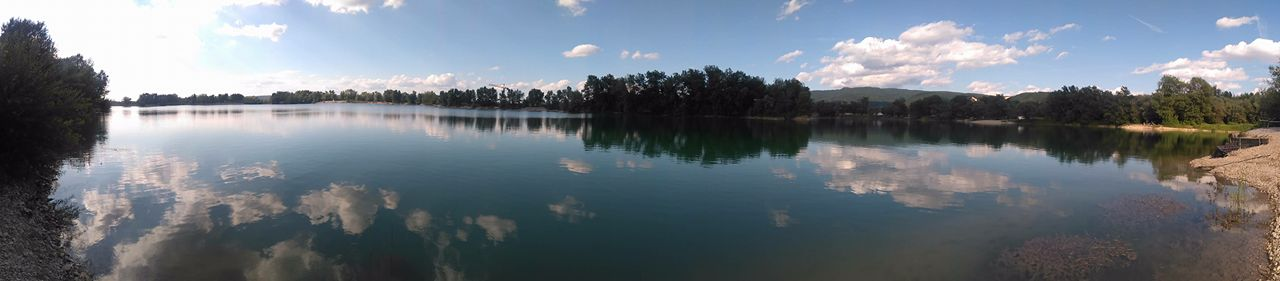
Panorama picture of a large Zajarki lake.

== Demographics ==
According to the 2021 census, the town of Zaprešić has 24,132 inhabitants, a decrease from 2011, 96.82% being Croats, the 2nd largest ethnic group is Serbs at 0.76% followed by Bosniaks at 0.48%.

Religious affiliation in Zaprešić is 81.39% Catholic, followed by 0.87% Orthodox and 5.15% "Other Christians".

Town of Zaprešić: Population trends 1857–2021
v

population	3120	3334	3634	4280	4660	5058	5404	5810	6284	6540	7484	9101	12773	20720	23125	25223	24133
	1857	1869	1880	1890	1900	1910	1921	1931	1948	1953	1961	1971	1981	1991	2001	2011	2021

Sources: Croatian Bureau of Statistics publications

The town is administratively divided into nine settlements, the largest of which is Zaprešić, covering a third of the town's area.

Population development by settlement
Settlement	1948	1953	1961	1971	1981	1991	2001	2011
Hruševec Kupljenski	627	609	608	488	552	450	453	432
Ivanec Bistranski	590	597	584	593	716	823	932	937
Jablanovec	865	851	861	843	868	1,042	1,342	1,378
Kupljenovo	559	628	644	618	682	722	705	704
Lužnica	96	67	91	89	65	64	62	40
Merenje	252	235	227	175	113	186	158	129
Pojatno	689	719	818	837	958	1,013	1,157	1,213
Šibice	312	297	340	466	385	742	777	746
Zaprešić	2,294	2,537	3,311	4,992	8,201	15,678	17,538	19,644
Total	6,284	6,540	7,484	9,101	12,540	20,720	23,125	25,223

=== Austro-Hungarian 1910 census ===
According to the 1910 census in Croatia, town of Zaprešić had 5,056 inhabitants, which were linguistically and religiously declared to be:

Town of Zaprešić
Language	Religion
total: 5,058: 1. Croatian 4,939 (97.6%); 2. Slovene 35 (0.69%); 3. Hungarian 28 (0.55%); 4. Serbian 16 (0.31%); 5. Czech 9 (0.17%); 6. German 7 (0.13%); 7. Italian 2 (0.03%); 8. others 22 (0.43%)	total: 5,058: 1. Roman Catholics 5,023 (99.3%); 2. Eastern Orthodox 16 (0.31%); 3. Jewish 13 (0.25%); 4. Calvinists 5 (0.09%); 5. Lutherans 1 (0.01%)

== Economy ==
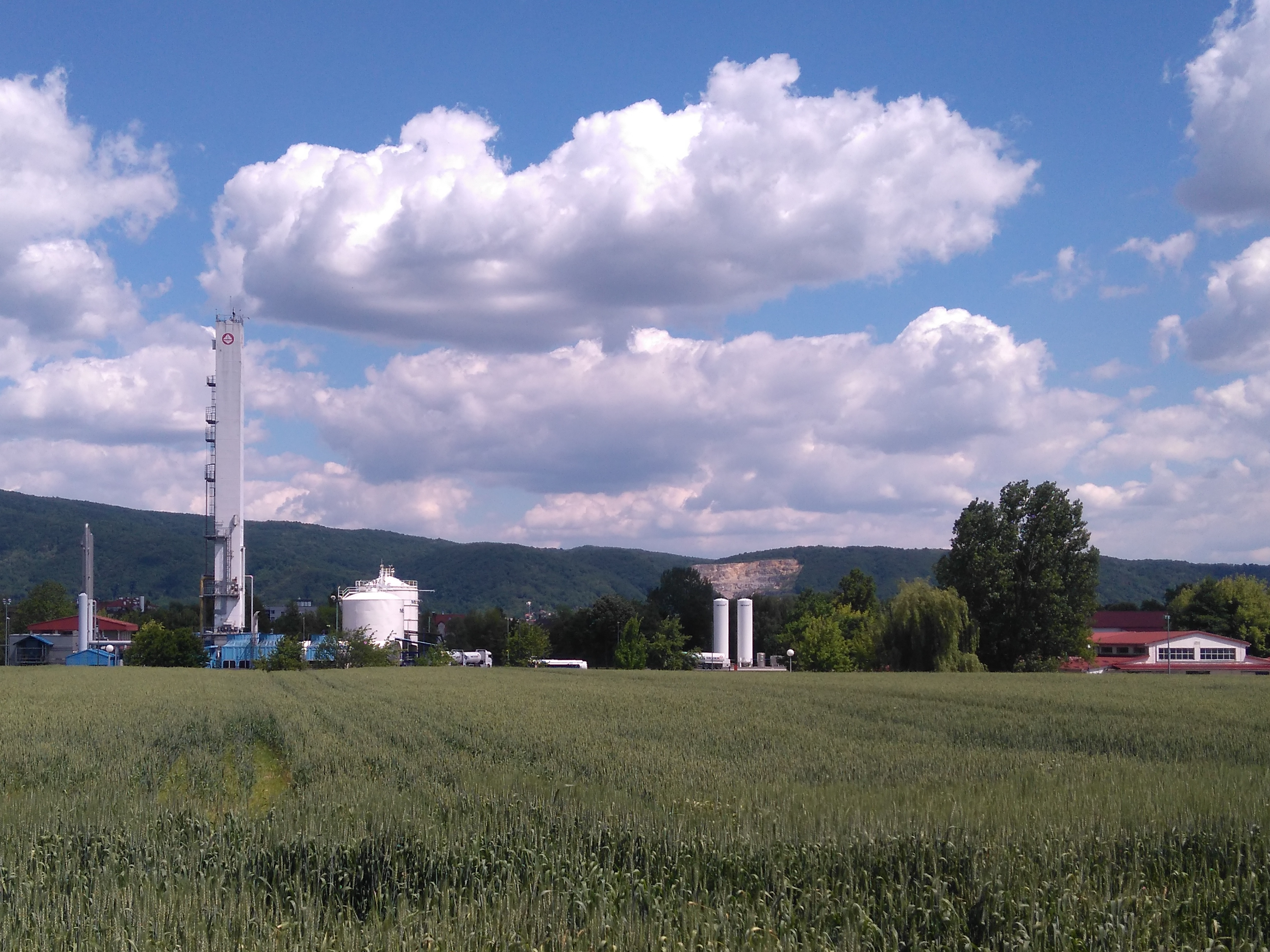
Messer Croatia Gas chemical facility

Due to its accessible location with favorable conditions for expansion, and a very high net migration, and population growth rates (estimated to be 29 persons per 1,000 per year), (Note: Calculated on the basis of 2001 Croatian census and Zagreb Police Department data from 2006) Zaprešić is expecting an economic boom. Despite the 2008 financial crisis that affected many cities in Croatia, including the capital, the town operates without loans and expects a yearly budget increase in the range of 20 to 30 percent. The tertiary sector is dominant with mainly retailing, and hospitality, and a smaller presence of tourism, as well as souvenir manufacturing and financial and business services.

The secondary sector is also present with ceramic industry (Inker - as of 2006 part of Roca), metalworking (Karbon Nova, Lanac, and Unija metali) and chemical industry (Messer Croatia plin, Montkemija). The primary sector mainly consists of agriculture, and is expected to continue shrinking. There are currently 3,040 hectares (7,512 acres) of arable land for agricultural use, but the town's general urban plan anticipates an economic shift will lower the amount of agricultural use to 930 hectares (2,298 acres) by 2015, thus speeding the process of suburbanization started by the expansion of Zagreb. The future of Zaprešić's economy is seen in the development of small, and mid-sized businesses, tourism, and food-related industries. The town's income tax rate is 12 percent. The town's budget in 2008 amounted to HRK 198 million.

The West Gate Shopping Center is a shopping mall located next to the Krapina River and A2 motorway, the center serves 2.3 million residents in the Zagreb region. It is also the largest in the Zagreb metropolitan area with 100,000 square meters (1,080,000 sq ft) of gross leasable area. Construction started in late 2007. It was opened in October 2009.

== Culture and media ==
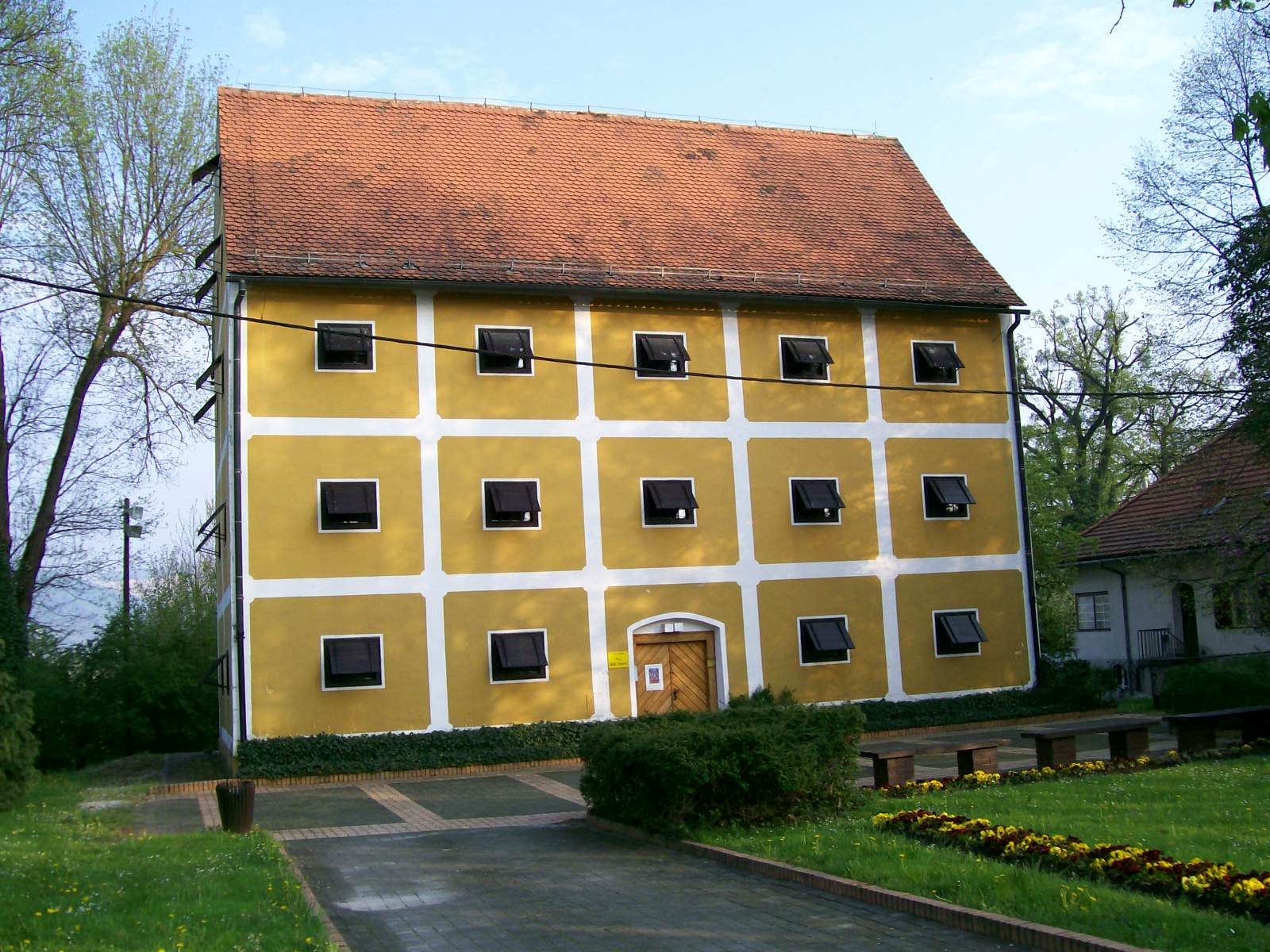
Matija Skurjeni Museum

Zaprešić's cultural heritage includes a series of six historic castles and palaces known as "the palace path" (Croatian: staza dvoraca): Lužnica mansion, Januševac palace, Laduč mansion, Oršić family mansion, Jakovlje palace, and Novi Dvori. Of these, Oršić and Januševec are in the zeroth category of cultural heritage preservation of UNESCO, Lužnica is in the first category of the Croatian Ministry of Culture, and Laduč and Novi Dvori are in the second category of the Ministry of Culture. Jakovlje palace is not involved in any cultural preservation program. Novi Dvori (also known as Novi Dvori Jelačićevi – New Jelačić Palace) is known for being the residence of Josip Jelačić, one of the most famous Croatian bans. However, before that it was inhabited by five families (the last one being Erdödy) after its construction in 1611 as a simple two-story house. It remains a well-preserved example of a manorial estate. The palace was left to the state in 1934 by Josip Jelačić's nephew and nieces. The town is home to the Museum of Matija Skurjeni (opened in 1984), a gallery of works by the renowned painter. It is located in the former granary of Novi Dvori. The art gallery Razvid, that opened in 1991, has held exhibitions of works by many important Croatian artists, such as Franjo Ferenčak, Ivan Lovrenčić, Drago Grgas, Davor Vuković (a native of Zaprešić) and Krešimir Trumbetaš. The Zaprešić main library, "Ante Kovačić", is a part of the association of Zagreb City Libraries (Croatian: Knjižnice Grada Zagreba, KGZ), and has 5,541 members with access to 78,385 books. Albin Bonzelli, an employee of Baron Levin Rauch, founded the first library in Zaprešić area in 1921 in Brdovec. A more recent library was founded in 1958, and moved to its present location in 1986.

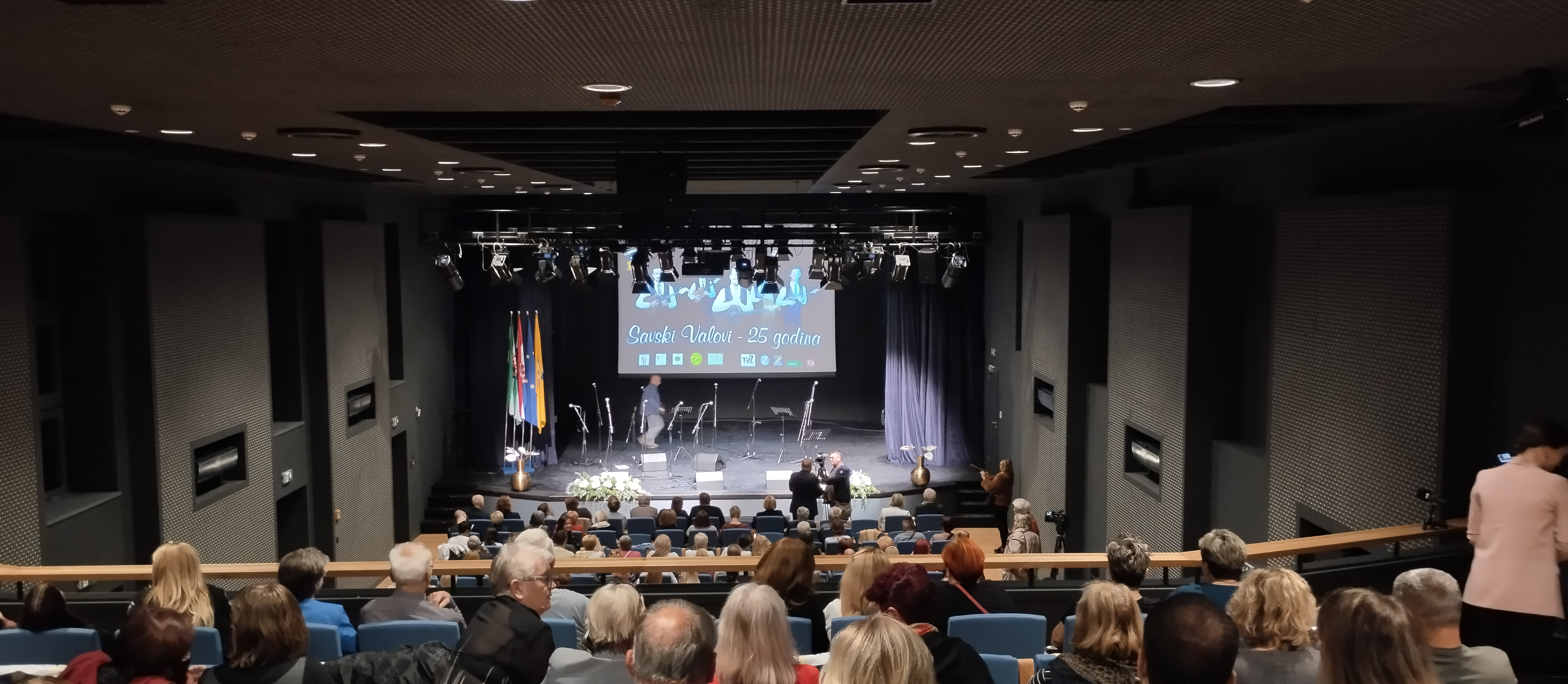
Great Hall of Zaprešić Open University.

Zaprešić contains the ornithological reserve Zaprešić-Sava, which is located south of the town, at Lake Zajarki. The reserve is covered mainly with woods and thick low vegetation, and criss-crossed by fluvial marshes. Zaprešić operates a hunting office, which is made of eight clubs: Zaprešić, Kuna, Vidra, Fazan, Srnjak, Šljuka (offices in Luka, and Bistra) and Vepar. A radio station operates in Zaprešić: Radio Zaprešić (also known as Round Wave Station Zaprešić, Croatian: Krugovalna postaja Zaprešić). The station broadcasts an FM signal at 96.0 and 99.5 MHz, 24 hours each weekday. It was founded on 15 January 1987. In September 2015., radio station changed its name to "Z fm". The local monthly newspaper Prigorski Kaj has its seat in the nearby settlement of Šenkovec in the Brdovec municipality. In 2009. Television Zaprešić (Croatian: Televizija Zaprešić) started operating as a local cable television channel. In April 2015., Television Zaprešić was granted concession for terrestrial broadcasting and changed its name to Televizija Zapad (English: Television West). The television is dedicated to cover the topics of local importance.

== Sports and recreation ==
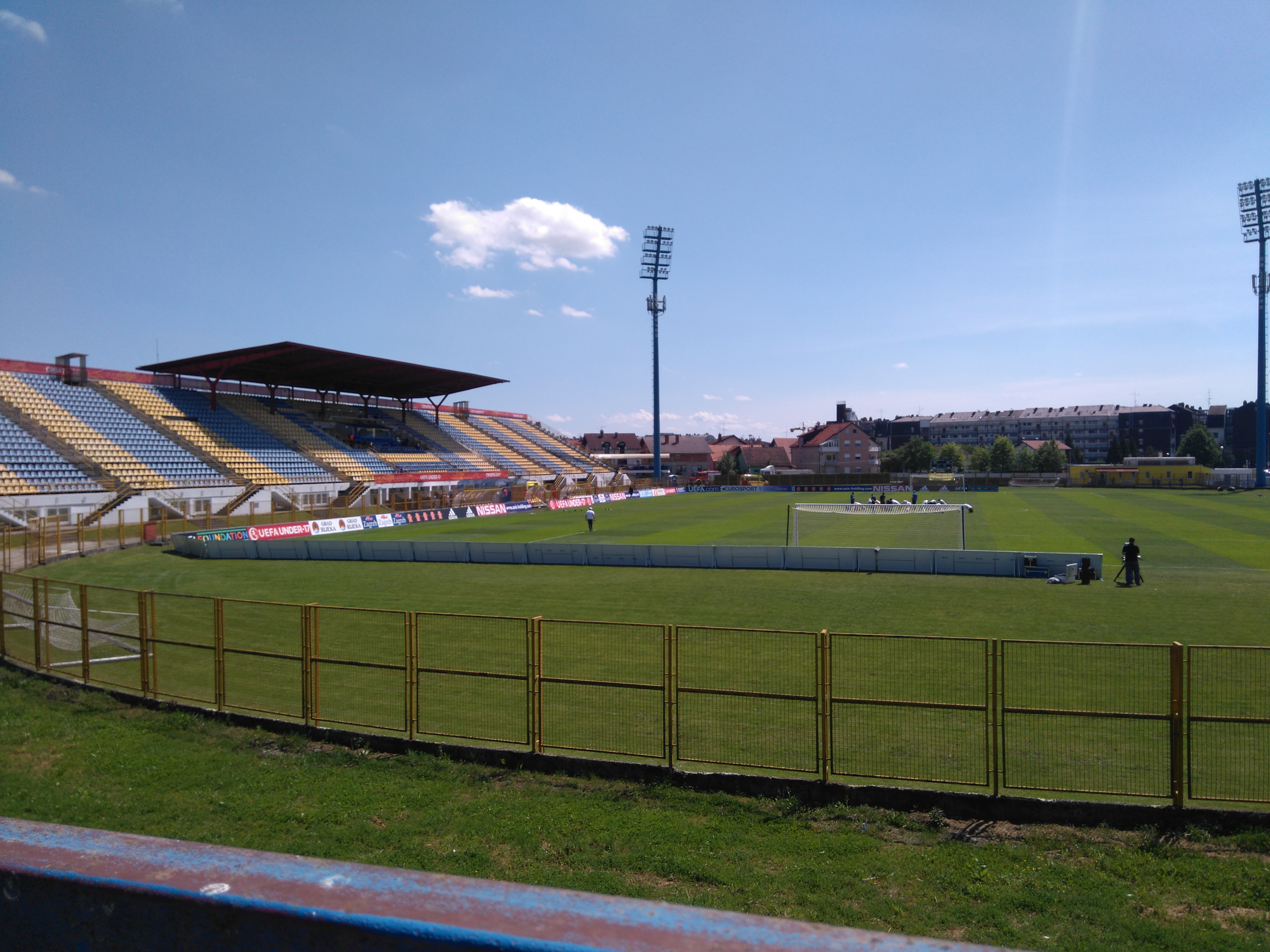
Zaprešić Stadium after the 2017 UEFA European Under-17 Championship match between France and Faroe Islands

Organized sports in Zaprešić started in 1926, with the first football match between unregistered teams from Zaprešić and Savski Marof. The football club NK Sava (now called NK Inter Zaprešić) was soon formed in 1929. There are 20 sport clubs and associations in Zaprešić, and the most popular ones are association football, basketball, handball, bowling, tennis, table tennis, chess, cycling, taekwondo, and bocce. Zaprešić is the home to several influential sports clubs, such as NK Inter Zaprešić (football), KK Fortuna Zaprešić (basketball), RK Zaprešić (handball), KK Zaprešić (bowling) and others. KK Zaprešić is host of the 2026 Mediterranean Bowling Championships.

=== Football ===
NK Inter Zaprešić currently plays in the top tier Hrvatski Telekom Prva Liga. It is currently the best-placed football club in the county. Most of the sports clubs in Zaprešić are members of the Town of Zaprešić Sports Society (Croatian: Zajednica športskih udruga Grada Zaprešića). The main sports venue is the ŠRC Zaprešić (Sports and Recreation Center Zaprešić), which encompasses a football stadium and a gym. There are other sports courts in Hruševec Kupljenski, Ivanec, Jablanovec, Kupljenovo, and Pojatno. NK Inter Zaprešić's home stadium is ŠRC Zaprešić, located in the northwest part of the town and handling up to 5,528 visitors.

=== Golf ===
The 140-hectare (346-acre) golf resort "Novi dvori" was opened on 16 October 2004, with Prime Minister Ivo Sanader being the first to tee off. However, as of 2009, only a few parts are in use, with a 27-hole course currently under construction. Nine of these holes will be reserved for practice and eighteen for tournament play. The center operates a driving range with two practice courses of different sizes, and an area to practice putting green play. One practice course is sheltered from weather conditions and the whole golf course has night lighting. In terms of normal play, three par 3 holes are currently operational and friendly par 9 tournaments are often held at the course. The course also has other amenities, such as a restaurant and the proximity to the Novi Dvori palace. When the construction ends, the golfers will have access to a conference room, a business center, a fitness club, a sauna, and a massage parlor.

== Government ==
Zaprešić town council in the aftermath of 2021 local elections: SDP (red) - 4 seats, Fokus (cyan) - 2 seats, Nezavisni za Zaprešić (yellow) - 1 seat, HDZ and HSU (blue) - 6 seats, DP-Most-Projekt domovina (navy blue) 6 seats.

Despite the settlement of Zaprešić's long history, only with the founding of the Town of Zaprešić on 30 November 1995 did it have its own elected representatives. The towns administration includes two tiers of power: a mayor and a town council. The town council is elected each four years. The mayor (Croatian: gradonačelnik) has executive power. He is elected directly by the voters. Current Mayor is Željko Turk (Croatian Democratic Union—HDZ, elected in 2006, re-elected 2009, 2013 and 2017), whose deputy's are Damir Benčević and Alan Labus. Zaprešić is part of the 1st Croatian electoral district, which consists of western Zagreb, and the Zaprešić metropolitan area.

The town council (Croatian: gradsko vijeće) has the legislative power over the town. It represents the residents of Zaprešić and manages the town's budget, and it is composed of twenty-one members with one presiding and two vice-presiding members.

== Education ==
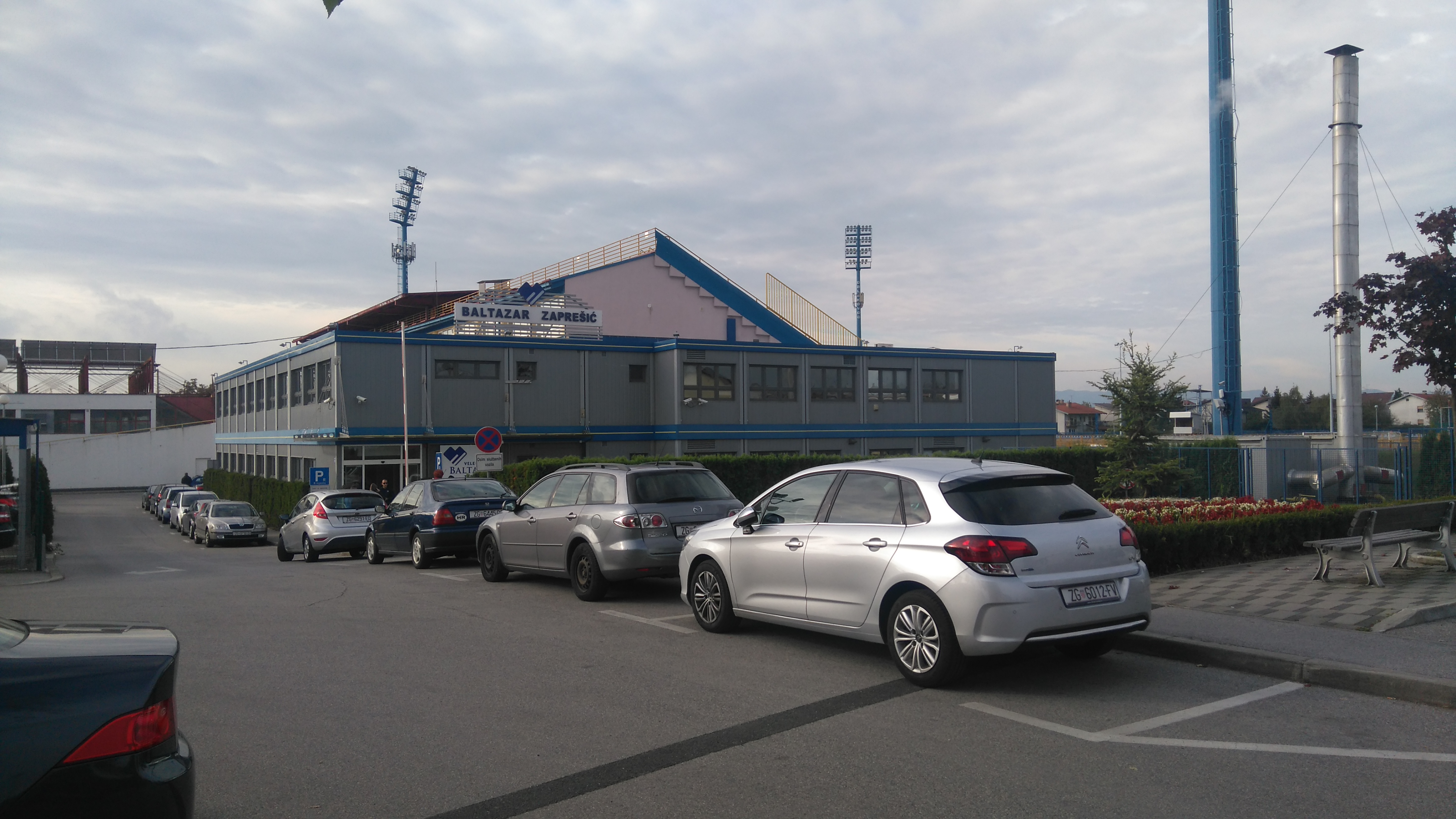
University of Applied Sciences Zaprešić

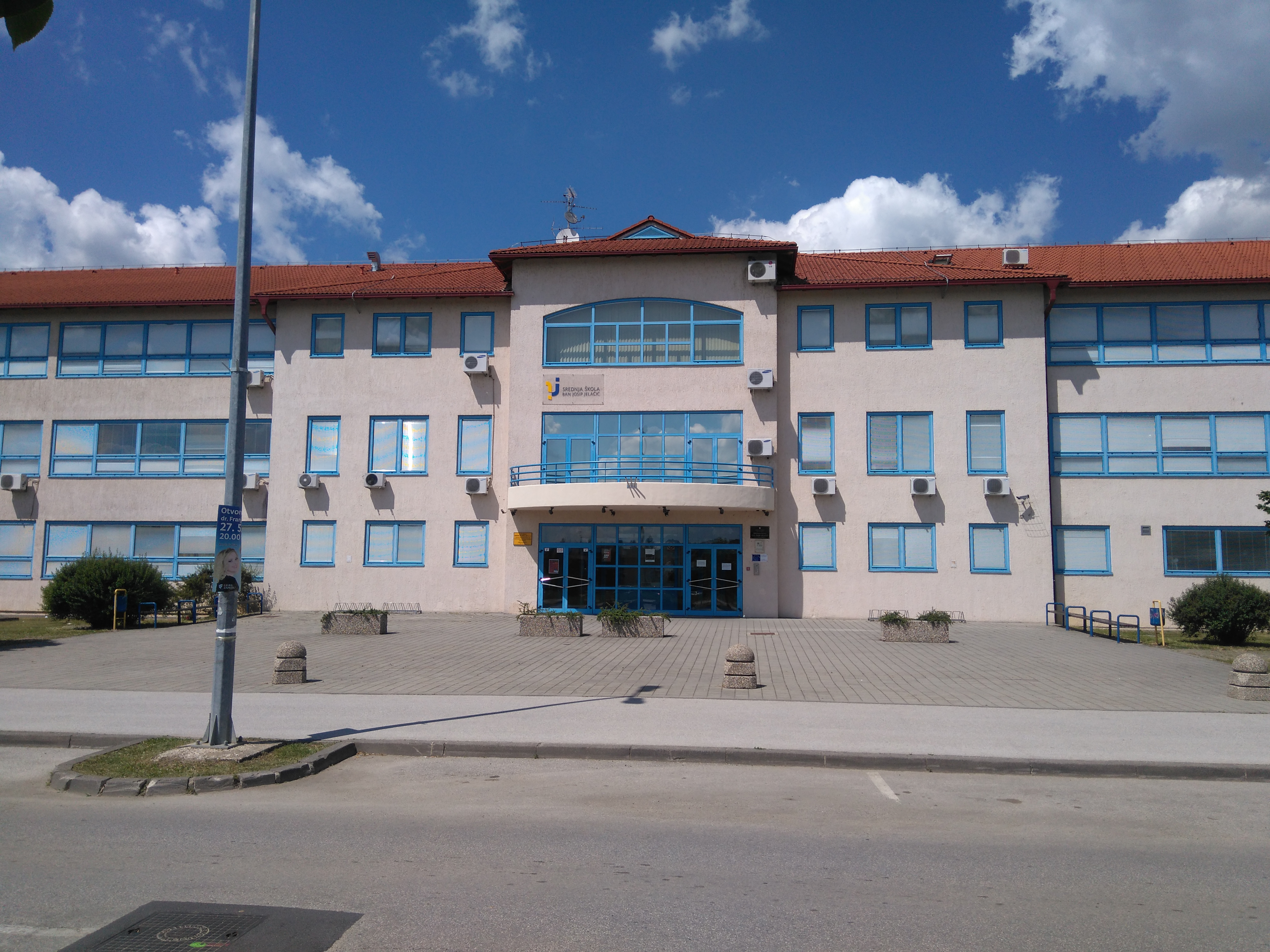
Ban Josip Jelačić High School

The Town of Zaprešić provides education ranging from pre-school to higher education. These include four registered kindergartens (stationed on seven locations), four elementary schools, one high school, and one college. Elementary schools located in Zaprešić include Antun Augustinčić, Ljudevit Gaj, and Kupljenovo elementary schools, and a branch of the Bistra elementary school from the Bistra municipality. The Ban Josip Jelačić High School is located on the Franjo Tuđman Square in the northwestern part of the town. Zaprešić has a University of Applied Sciences which offers courses in business and management, named after the Croatian historian and theologian Baltazar Adam Krčelić, and located in the town center on Novak Street. The open university in Zaprešić (Croatian: Pučko otvoreno učilište Zaprešić) offers various courses in languages, computer science, and musical instruments, as well as vocational training.

== Public safety ==
There are two firefighting units active in Zaprešić proper:

- Zaprešić Fire Department (Javna vatrogasna postrojba grada Zaprešića) - professional firefighting unit, active under this name since January 2000.
- Zaprešić Volunteer Fire Department (Dobrovoljno vatrogasno društvo Zaprešić) - volunteer firefighting unit, founded in February 1901. One of the oldest of its kind in Croatia.

== Transport ==
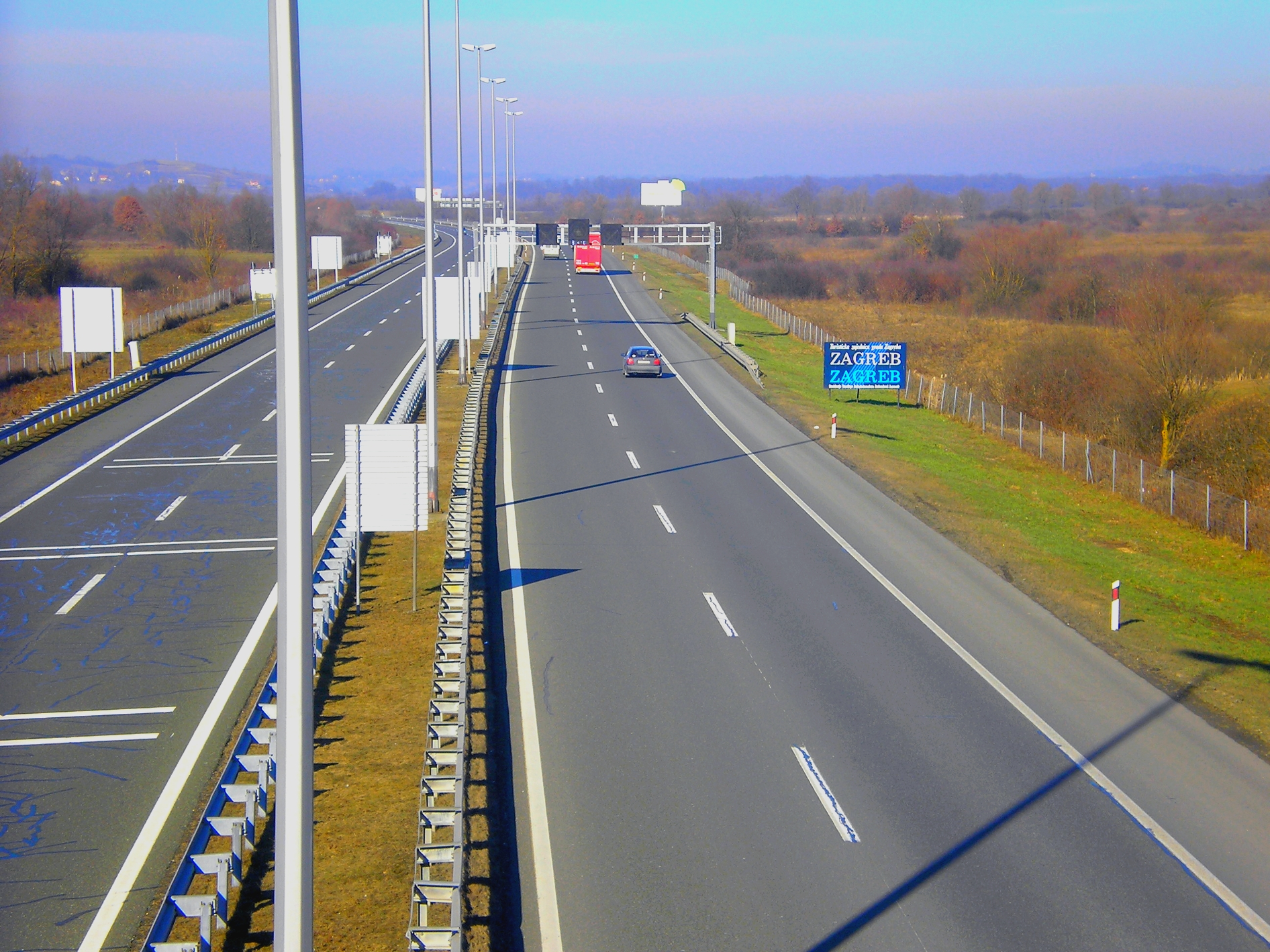
A2 Highway near Zaprešić

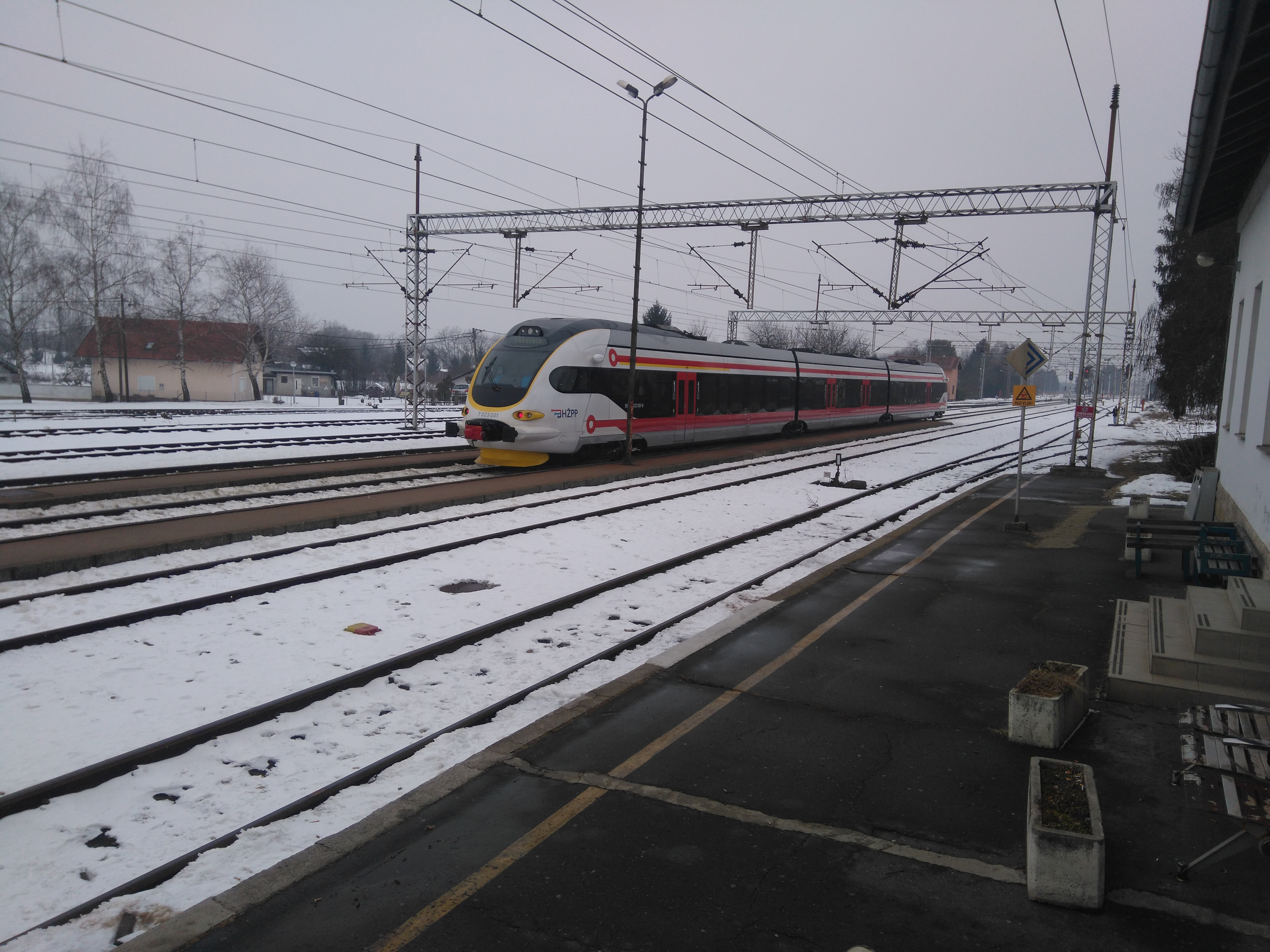
Commuter train departing from Zaprešić railway station

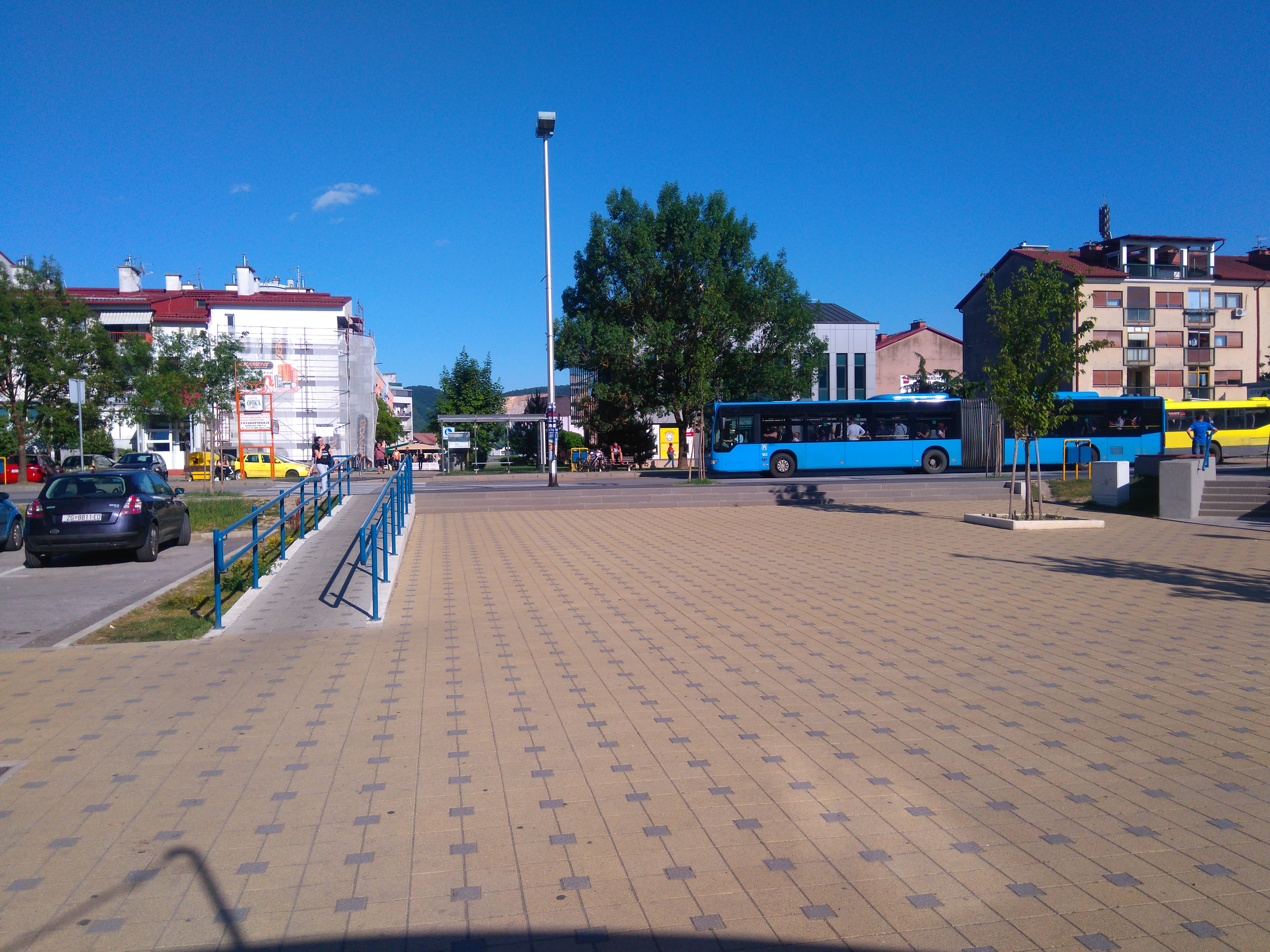
Zaprešić bus terminal

The town is a major transport hub for the area of Zagreb County and Zagreb itself. It is thus known as the "northwestern gate to Zagreb County." The Zagreb bypass, and the tolled A2 highway (Zagreb–Macelj, toward Austria; part of European Route E59, and pan-European corridor Xa) pass through the eastern part of Zaprešić, providing Zaprešić with highway access at a cloverleaf interchange. The D225 state road is a major arterial road in Zaprešić. It forms the Pavao Lončar and Marshal Tito Streets, leading west towards Brdovec, Marija Gorica and Slovenia, and east towards western Zagreb, Jablanovec, and Stubica. According to the current urban plan, the traffic on the D225 will be re-routed through two bypasses along the northern and western railway lines to clear the center of Zaprešić of 25,000 daily commuters driving on a two-lane road. (Note: The Prigorski Kaj article actually delineates a southern bypass to re-route D225 and a northern bypass to alleviate traffic on the County Route Ž2186 (not directly named in the article).)

Mass transit provides intra-city and inter-city connections in form of bus and rail. Zaprešić is a major railway intersection, with railways leading west to Slovenia (Corridor X), north to Zabok, and Kumrovec (Corridor Xa) and east to the main regional railway hub Zagreb. Croatian Railways services the Zaprešić train station with major interstate trains going to the west, but also with the suburban line Savski Marof–Zagreb Main Station–Dugo Selo. The town is serviced by two bus companies: the regional Zagrebački električni tramvaj (ZET) and local Meštrović prijevoz. ZET operates line 172 to Zaprešić, which starts at the Črnomerec bus terminal in Zagreb and runs every 8 to 15 minutes during day, and at irregular intervals during the night. Lines 176 and 177 run to the Zaprešić suburban municipality of Bistra. Meštrović prijevoz, the main intra-city bus company of Zaprešić, operates bus lines connecting Zaprešić and all municipalities in its metropolitan area.

Zaprešić lies along the left bank of the Sava River, but it does not have any bridges that would connect the town to Samobor, on the other bank, as the nearest bridge is the Podsused bridge, located in the Podsused – Vrapče district of Zagreb. However, two ferries connect Zaprešić with the roads in Medsave and Samoborski Otok, small villages near Samobor. The widest river in the area, the Sava River, used to be navigable up to Krško, Slovenia in Roman times. However, it is, as of 2009, navigable only up to Rugvica, leaving Zaprešić with no more possibility of river transport. The town does not have a port on any of its rivers.

To establish better transport capabilities, and create a solid ground for the emerging air sports that are already available in the town (e.g. hang gliding or paragliding), an airport is planned northeast of the town, between the Krapina River and the railroad. The land at this location is unused, uninhabited, and administratively selected for sports and recreation. The arrangement of the runways, taxiways, air traffic control building, hangar, and other necessary buildings have already been determined. The airport is intended to serve primarily as a sports airport, for teaching flying, and for charter flights. As of January 2009 the date when the construction starts had not yet been announced.

== Notable inhabitants ==
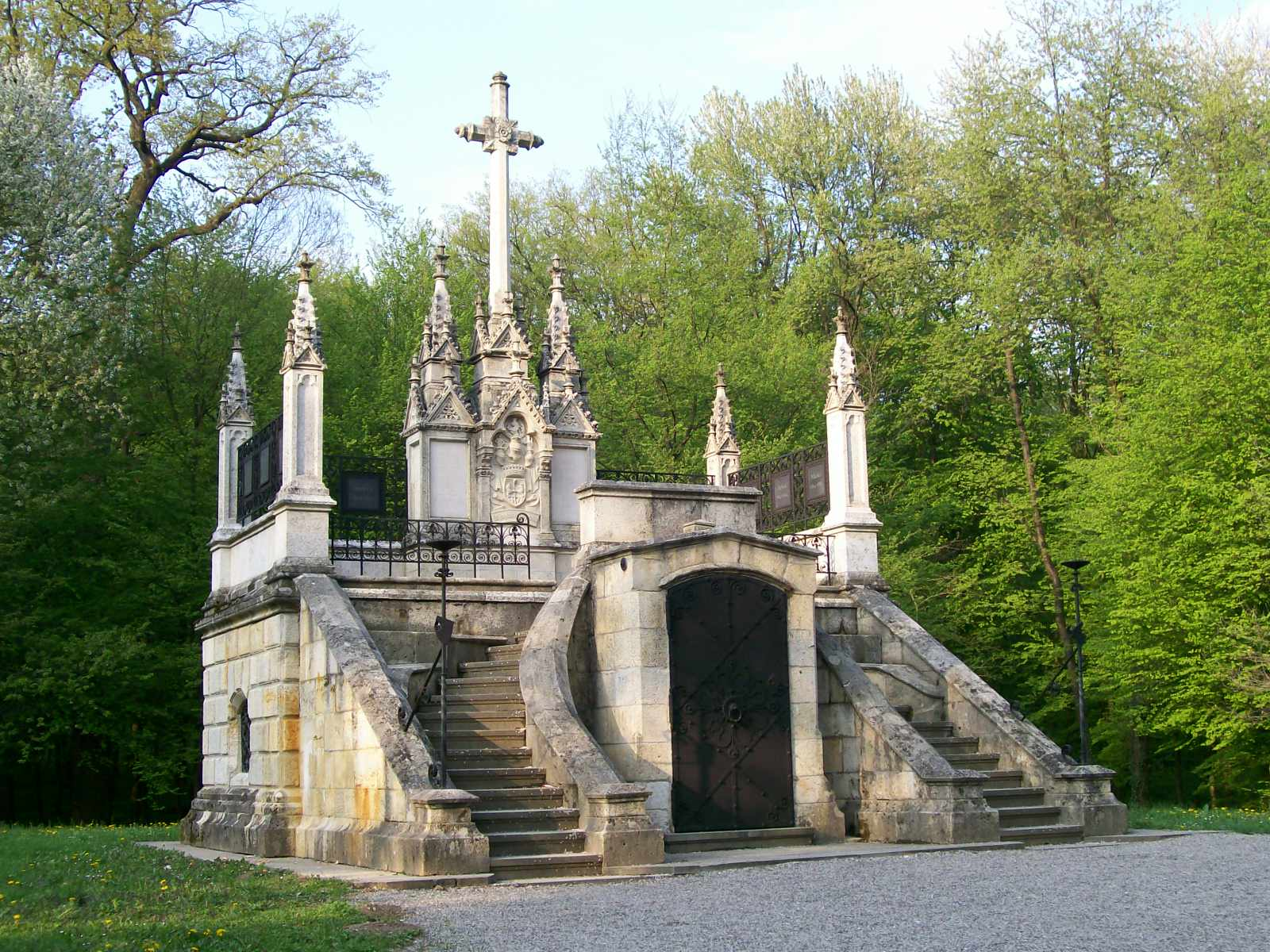
Jelačić family tomb

- Josip Jelačić (1801–59), politician.
- Baltazar Adam Krčelić (1715–78), priest and writer.
- Pavao Štoos (1806–62), priest and poet.
- Ante Kovačić (1854–89), writer.
- Matija Skurjeni (1898–1990), painter.
- Davor Gobac (born 1964), musician.
- Davor Božinović, politician.
