= Šibice =

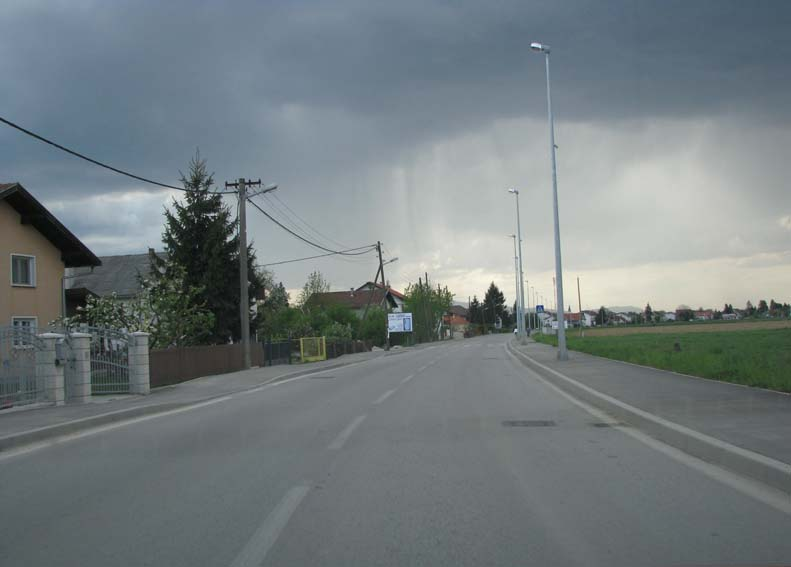

- Location within Croatia
- Coordinates: 45°51′40″N 15°46′45″E
- Country: Croatia
- County: Zagreb County
- City: Zaprešić

Area
  - Total: 2.7 km^{2} (1.0 sq mi)

Population (2021)
  - Total: 759
  - Density: 280/km^{2} (730/sq mi)
- Time zone: UTC+1 (CET)
  - Summer (DST): UTC+2 (CEST)

Šibice is a naselje (settlement) in the town of Zaprešić, Zagreb County, Croatia. According to the 2011 census, it has 746 inhabitants living in an area of 2.77 square kilometers (1.07 sq mi).

== Climate ==
Since records began in 1995, the highest temperature recorded at the local weather station was 38.5 °C (101.3 °F), on 4 August 2017. The coldest temperature was −22.9 °C (−9.2 °F), on 10 February 2005.
