= Merenje =

- Location within Croatia
- Coordinates: 45°57′5″N 15°47′6″E
- Country: Croatia
- County: Zagreb County
- City: Zaprešić

Area
  - Total: 1.9 km^{2} (0.73 sq mi)

Population (2021)
  - Total: 117
  - Density: 62/km^{2} (160/sq mi)
- Time zone: UTC+1 (CET)
  - Summer (DST): UTC+2 (CEST)

Merenje is a naselje (settlement) in the town of Zaprešić, Zagreb County, Croatia. According to the 2011 census, it has 129 inhabitants living in an area of 1.82 square kilometers (0.70 sq mi). This makes it the smallest settlement by area in Zaprešić.
