= Željko Turk =

Croatian politician

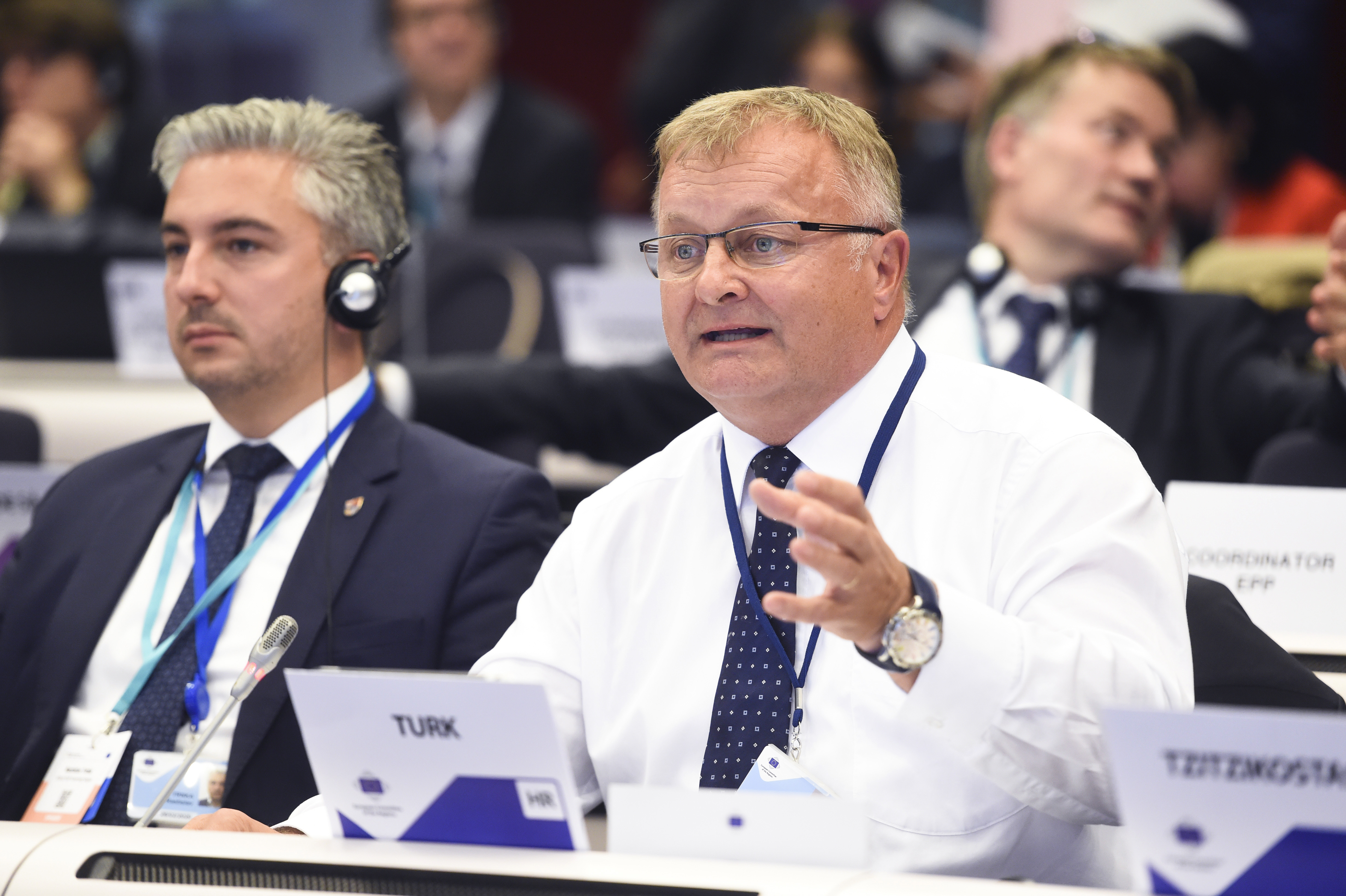

Mayor of Zaprešić
- Incumbent
- Assumed office 1 November 2006
- Preceded by: Vinko Morović

Member of the Croatian Parliament
- Incumbent
- Assumed office 11 January 2008

Personal details
- Born: 25 March 1962 (age 64) Zagreb, SFR Yugoslavia
- Party: Croatian Democratic Union (HDZ)
- Education: University of Zagreb
- Profession: Politician

Željko Turk (born 25 March 1962 in Zagreb) is the current mayor of Zaprešić, a town in Zagreb County, Croatia.

== Business career ==
Turk began his working career in Regeneracija factory, in town of Zabok. In 1991 he founded his own private company centered around textile production and trade.

== Political career ==
He became the mayor in 2006. He is affiliated with the Croatian Democratic Union (HDZ). He earned a seat in the Croatian Parliament at the 2007 elections and, as of January 11, 2008, constitutes a part of the sixth assembly of the Croatian Parliament. As the mayor of Zaprešić, Turk serves as the president of the Association of Cities. In 2017 local elections, Turk won another mandate over Danijel Saić of SDP. In 2021, Turk was re-elected as mayor of Zaprešić for the fifth time after beating Barbara Knežević of Homeland Movement in second round of local elections, which made him one of the longest serving mayors in Croatia.

=== Policies ===
Under Turk in 2016, Zaprešić was the city with largest public transport subventions in the country. In 2017, Turk stated that he is neutral in regard to proposed legislation which would limit of mandates of mayors and county prefects, saying that the proposed legislation has both positive and negative aspects. In 2018 Turk introduced parking fees in Zaprešić, which united the entire political opposition against him and sparked some protests in Zaprešić.

== Personal life ==
Turk graduated at the Faculty of Economics and Business of the University of Zagreb.

Preceded by Vinko Morović	Mayor of Zaprešić; 2006–present	Succeeded by Incumbent
