= Krapina (river) =

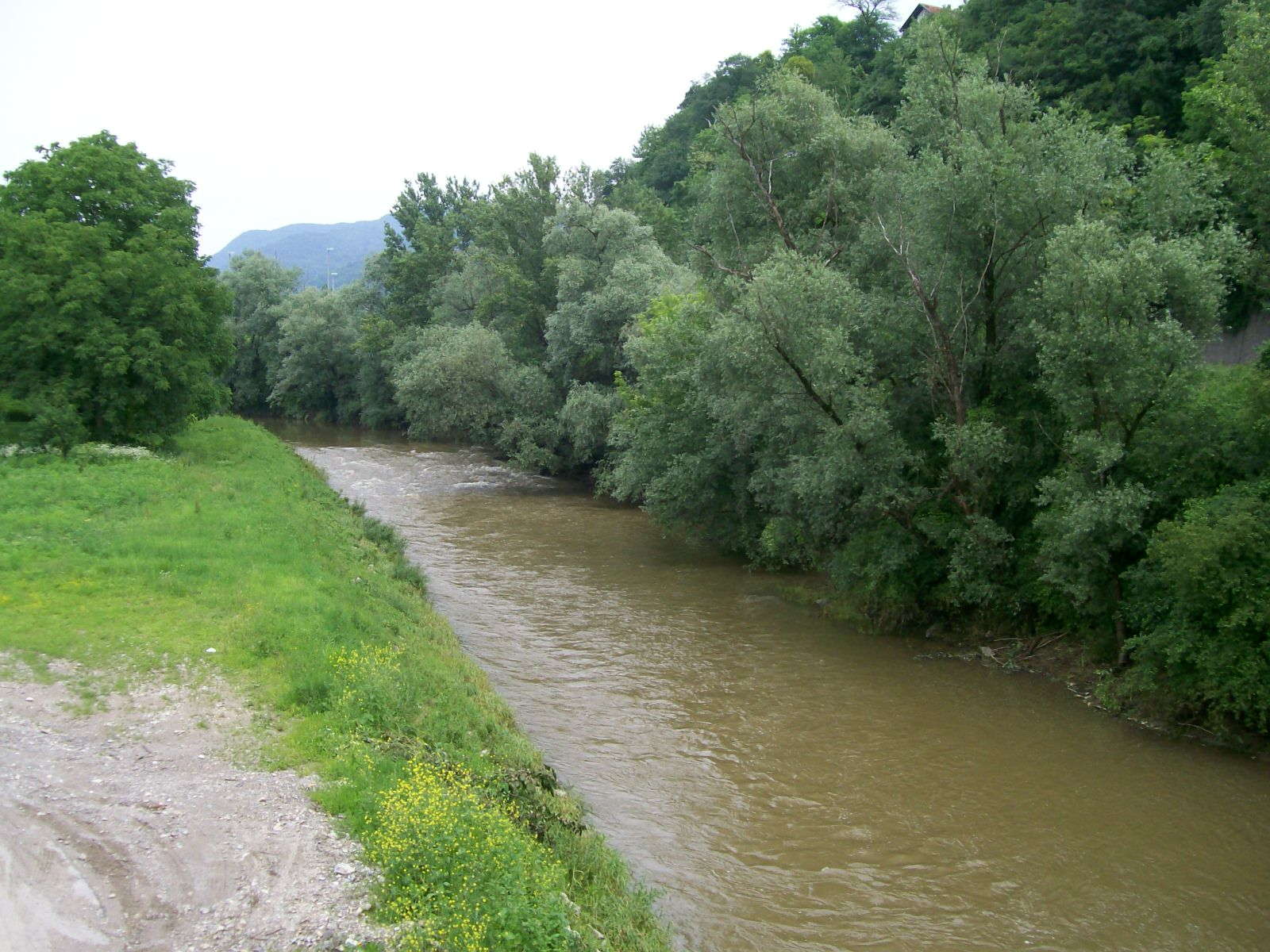
- River Krapina near Zaprešić

Location
- Country: Croatia

Physical characteristics
- Mouth
  - location: Sava
  - coordinates: 45.8274°N 15.8234°E
- Length: 66.9 km (41.6 mi)
- Basin size: 1,237 km^{2} (478 sq mi)

Basin features
- Progression: Sava→ Danube→ Black Sea

The Krapina is a Croatian river flowing through Krapina-Zagorje County and Zagreb County. It is a tributary to the Sava. The confluence of the Krapina River and the Sava River is near Zaprešić. The Krapina's length is 66.9 km (41.6 mi) and its basin covers an area of 1,237 km^{2} (478 mi^{2}).

The hydrological parameters of Krapina are regularly monitored in Croatia at Zlatar Bistrica, Bračak and Kupljenovo.

The name "Krapina" is supposed to come from Latin word "carpinus" (of the carp). Another theory is that it comes from Proto-Indo-European *(s)ker (to cut) and *h2ep (water), meaning "the water that cuts through the valley".

== Bibliography ==
- Koren, Toni; Lauš, Boris; Šašić, Martina; Mihoci, Iva; Štih, Ana; Bralić, Petra; Gomboc, Stanislav (2017-12-31). "Contribution to the Knowledge of the Butterfly Fauna (Lepidoptera: Papilionoidea) of Hrvatsko Zagorje, Croatia". Natura Croatica: Periodicum Musei Historiae Naturalis Croatici. 26 (2): 167–196. doi:10.20302/NC.2017.26.15. eISSN 1848-7386.
