= Ivanec Bistranski =

- Location within Croatia
- Coordinates: 45°50′49″N 15°50′3″E
- Country: Croatia
- County: Zagreb County
- City: Zaprešić

Area
  - Total: 6.9 km^{2} (2.7 sq mi)

Population (2021)
  - Total: 887
  - Density: 130/km^{2} (330/sq mi)
- Time zone: UTC+1 (CET)
  - Summer (DST): UTC+2 (CEST)

Ivanec Bistranski is a naselje (settlement) in the town of Zaprešić, Zagreb County, Croatia. According to the 2011 census, it has 937 inhabitants living in an area of 6.65 square kilometers (2.57 sq mi).
