= Hruševec Kupljenski =

- Location within Croatia
- Coordinates: 45°56′47″N 15°47′49″E
- Country: Croatia
- County: Zagreb County
- City: Zaprešić

Area
  - Total: 3.8 km^{2} (1.5 sq mi)

Population (2021)
  - Total: 428
  - Density: 110/km^{2} (290/sq mi)
- Time zone: UTC+1 (CET)
  - Summer (DST): UTC+2 (CEST)

Hruševec Kupljenski is a naselje (settlement) in the town of Zaprešić, Zagreb County, Croatia. According to the 2011 census, it has 432 inhabitants spread over an area of 3.02 square kilometers (1.17 sq mi).
