= Lužnica, Croatia =

Lužnica
- Naselje
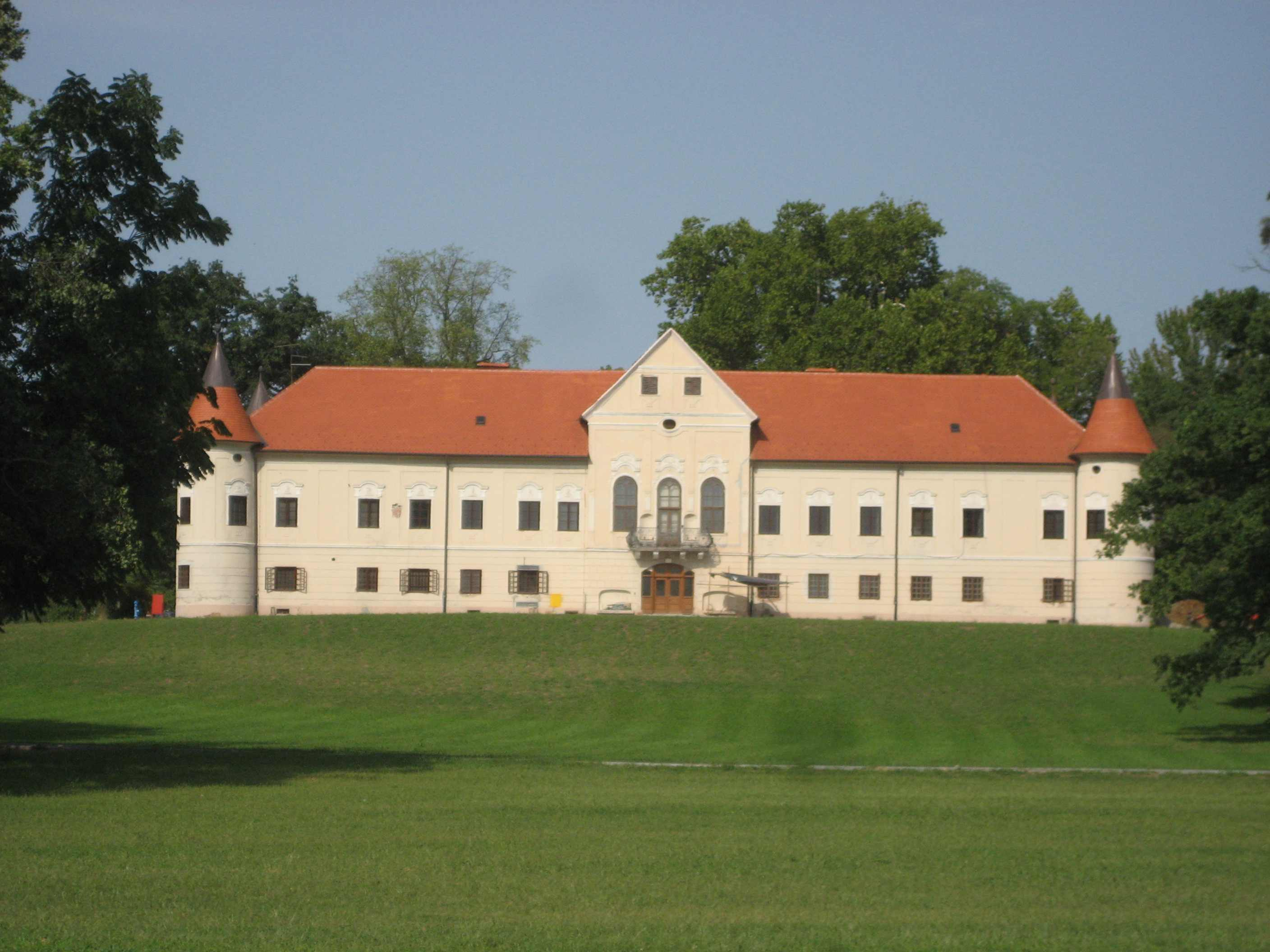
- Lužnica castle

- Location within Croatia
- Coordinates: 45°51′58″N 15°46′48″E
- Country: Croatia
- County: Zagreb County
- Town: Zaprešić

Area
  - Total: 2.0 km^{2} (0.77 sq mi)

Population (2021)
  - Total: 27
  - Density: 14/km^{2} (35/sq mi)
- Time zone: UTC+1 (CET)
  - Summer (DST): UTC+2 (CEST)
- Postal code: 10290
- Area code: 01

Lužnica is a settlement (naselje) in the town of Zaprešić, Zagreb County, Croatia. According to the 2001 census, it had 62 inhabitants, spread over an area of 1.93 square kilometers (0.75 sq mi). It is thus the smallest settlement by population in Zaprešić. Lužnica is the location of the Lužnica Castle, a baroque castle and touristic point of interest built in 1791 and owned by the Convent of St. Vincent de Paul. The nuns operate nursing home for the elderly. The castle was previously owned by Croatian nobility, namely the Čikulin, Moscon and Rauch families.
