= Kupljenovo =

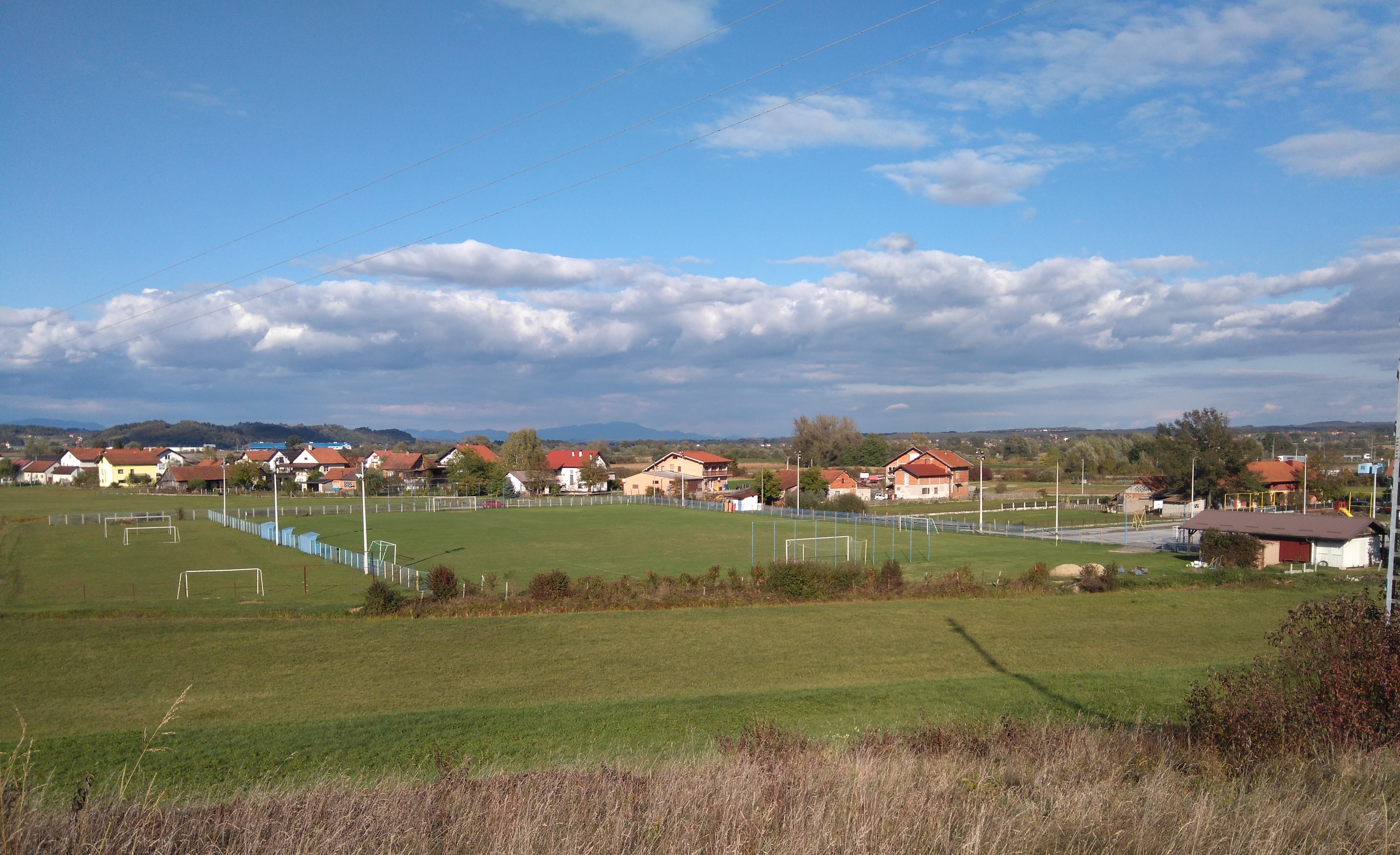

- Location within Croatia
- Coordinates: 45°55′55″N 15°48′54″E
- Country: Croatia
- County: Zagreb County
- City: Zaprešić

Area
  - Total: 4.4 km^{2} (1.7 sq mi)

Population (2021)
  - Total: 692
  - Density: 160/km^{2} (410/sq mi)
- Time zone: UTC+1 (CET)
  - Summer (DST): UTC+2 (CEST)

Kupljenovo is a naselje (settlement) in the town of Zaprešić, Zagreb County, Croatia. According to the 2011 census, it has 704 inhabitants living in an area of 4.01 square kilometers (1.55 sq mi).
