= Luka, Zagreb County =

Luka
- Municipality
- Location within Croatia
- Coordinates: 45.96°N 15.82°E
- Country: Croatia
- Region: Central Croatia
- County: Zagreb County
- Muni. seat: Luka
- Settlements: 5 settlements: Krajska Ves; Luka (seat); Pluska; Vadina; Žejinci

Government
  - Mayor: Darko Kralj

Area
  - Municipality: 17.4 km^{2} (6.7 sq mi)
  - Urban: 4.2 km^{2} (1.6 sq mi)

Population (2021)
  - Municipality: 1,265
  - Density: 72.7/km^{2} (188/sq mi)
  - Urban: 420
  - Urban density: 100/km^{2} (260/sq mi)
- Time zone: UTC+1 (CET)
  - Summer (DST): UTC+2 (CEST)
- Postal codes: 10296
- Area code: 01
- License plates: ZG
- Website: opcina-luka.hr

Luka is a village and a municipality in Croatia in the Zagreb County.

In the 2011 census, there were a total of 1,351 inhabitants in the municipality, in the following settlements:

- Krajska Ves, population 144
- Luka, population 416
- Pluska, population 207
- Vadina, population 185
- Žejinci, population 399

The absolute majority are Croats.
