= Novi Dvori =

Feudal estate in Zaprešić, Croatia

Novi Dvori estate
- Novi dvori (Croatian)
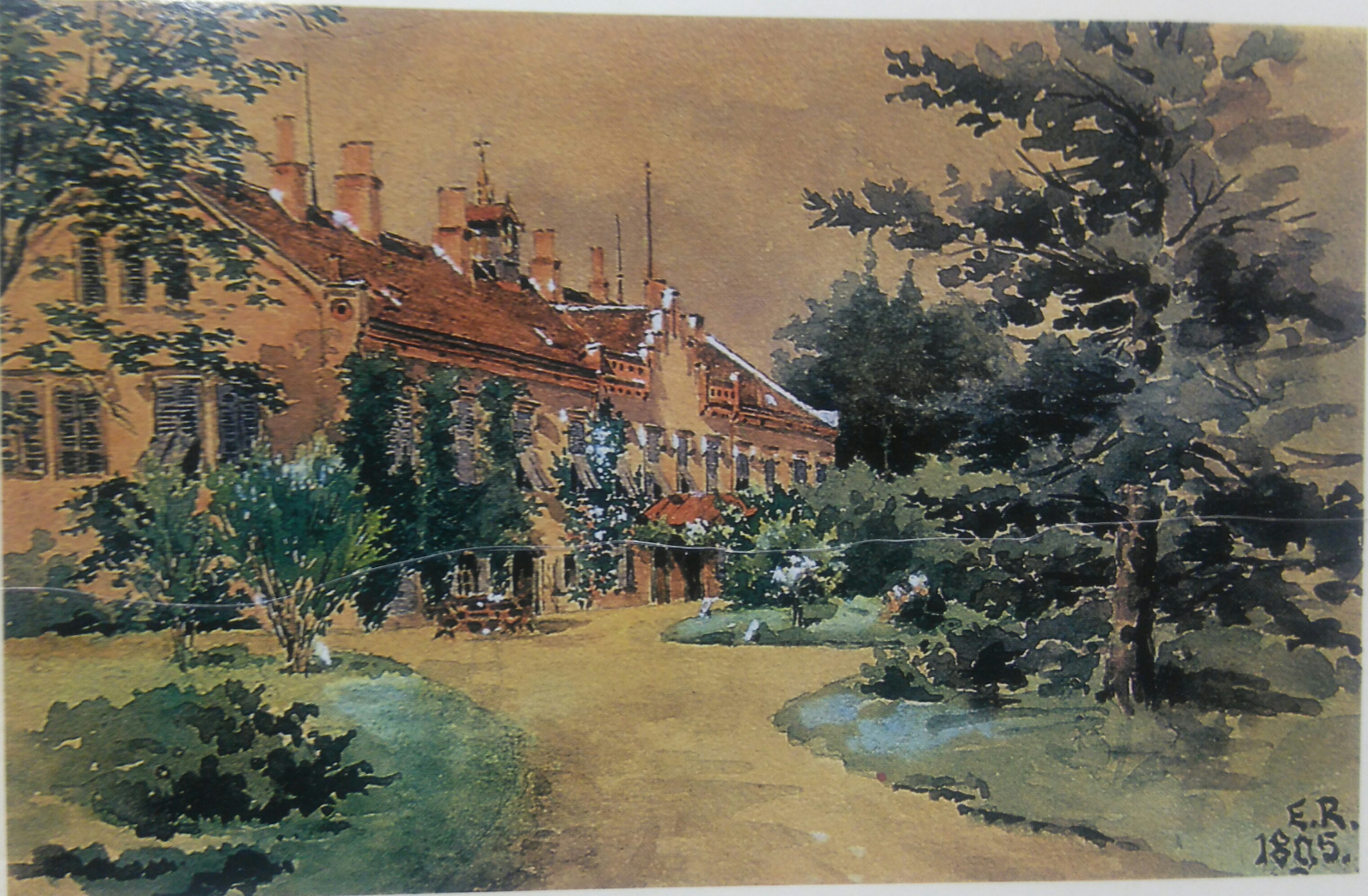
- Novi Dvori Manor as it was in 1895.

- Location within Croatia
- Interactive map of Novi Dvori estate
- 45°52′22″N 15°48′24″E
- Location: Zaprešić, Croatia

History
- Built: 1611

Site notes
- Area: 20,5 Hectares
- Architect(s): Hermann Bollé (Chapel and Family tomb)
- Architectural styles: Early Historicism (Manor) Gothic Revival (Chapel and Family tomb)

Cultural Good of Croatia
- Official name: Kompleks Novi dvori
- Type: Protected cultural good
- Reference no.: Z-2072

Novi Dvori of Zaprešić, or Novi Dvori of Jelačić, is a feudal estate in the northwestern part of Zaprešić, Croatia. The estate consists of a castle, an old granary renovated into a museum, a circular threshing machine, a neo-gothic chapel and the Jelačić family tomb.

== History ==
=== Estate from 17th to 19th century ===
During the process of disintegration of larger Susedgrad-Stubica seigniory, Novi dvori (Curia Nova), are mentioned as independent entity as early as the beginning of the 17th century. Historian Stjepan Laljak links the estate's foundation with the abandonment of nearby Susedgrad Castle, also owned by Zrinski, which was once a seat of the Susedgrad seigniory but lost its purpose and became abandoned. According to a document dated in 1852, the Novi Dvori manor was first constructed in 1611 as an ordinary one story manor house mostly made of wood. This initial 17th century concept of a manor, consisted of what is today a western part of the building and its shape has been preserved only in the cellar. Throughout the history, the owners of this estate were Zrinski family, Čikulin family, Sermage family, Festetics family and Erdödy family. Almost each of these owners gradually expanded the manor to the east. In the second half of the 18th century Peter Troilo Sermage turned the manor house into a castle and added several economic buildings such as barns, granaries and circular threshing machine to the estate. By the 19th century, the castle became the property of Alexander Erdödy. The same family eventually sold the estate to ban Josip Jelačić in 1851.

=== Jelačić period ===
Although the law of the Triune Kingdom of Croatia, formally obliged each candidate for the position of Ban, to possess its own estate on Croatian soil, this criterion was briefly ignored upon Jelačić's appointment due to the Revolutions of 1848. This was subsequently commented by Jelačić using the following words:

"I have always lived for my Homeland and everything I did, I did out of loyalty and fidelity, not for those 400 000 forints that I spent for buying the land estate in sense of our Constitution, which asks for Croatian ban to also be the landowner in our Kingdom."

Written agreement on sale of the estate was made on March 23, 1852, despite Jelačić de facto buying the estate a year earlier. The new owner had both the estate and the castle reconstructed and annexed. He also further extended the castle 18 meters eastwards adding the east wing, while cellar, façade and the upper level were decorated. In 1855 construction of the neo-Gothic chapel of Saint Joseph started, and it was finished after some two months of work. Following completion, the chapel was blessed on May 25, 1855 by an archbishop of Zagreb Juraj Haulik.

The same year, on Christmas, Josip Jelačić's wife - countess Sofia, gave birth to their daughter Anica on the estate, for which occasion, the banner was raised on top of the manor. However, little Anica soon died as an infant, so Jelačić had her body buried Inside St. Joseph chapel. He also planned to build the family tomb on the estate, but died in 1859, before being able to execute this. In his last will, he expressed a wish to be buried next to his daughter in the estate chapel. After the death of Josip Jelačić, the estate became the property of his brother Đuro, who continued managing it and finally completed the tomb wished by Josip in 1884. The design for this was made by prominent Austrian architect Hermann Bollé. The construction of the tomb was made out of unused stone, taken from reconstruction of Zagreb Cathedral, which was badly damaged in 1880 Zagreb earthquake. After Đuro's death, the castle was inherited by his daughters Anka and Vera. In 1919, countess Vera Jelačić donated the family collection of weapons and paintings from Novi dvori, to what was then Croatian People's Museum. The daughters bequeathed the estate to the Croatian people in 1934. Although Đuro, Hermina, and much of the Jelačić family were initially buried in family arcade in Zagreb's Mirogoj cemetery, their remains were taken to the tomb in Novi Dvori in 1933, by the wish of countess Anka Jelačić. During the night on July 24, 1935, the tomb was looted by unknown vandals.

=== World War II and after ===
After the Yugoslav defeat in the April War of 1941, and formation of Nazi puppet state Independent State of Croatia, the castle became a residence of Ante Pavelić. In that period, a terrace was added to the southern side of the manor. After the end of the war, the estate was turned into an Agricultural High School. The castle was renovated during the 1960s, while school continued to operate on this location until 1977., when it relocated to Zagreb, leaving the estate empty. The tombs were looted again by vandals in 1987 who also, in this occasion, desecrated the remains of Josip Jelačić, his brother Antun and his little daughter Anica.

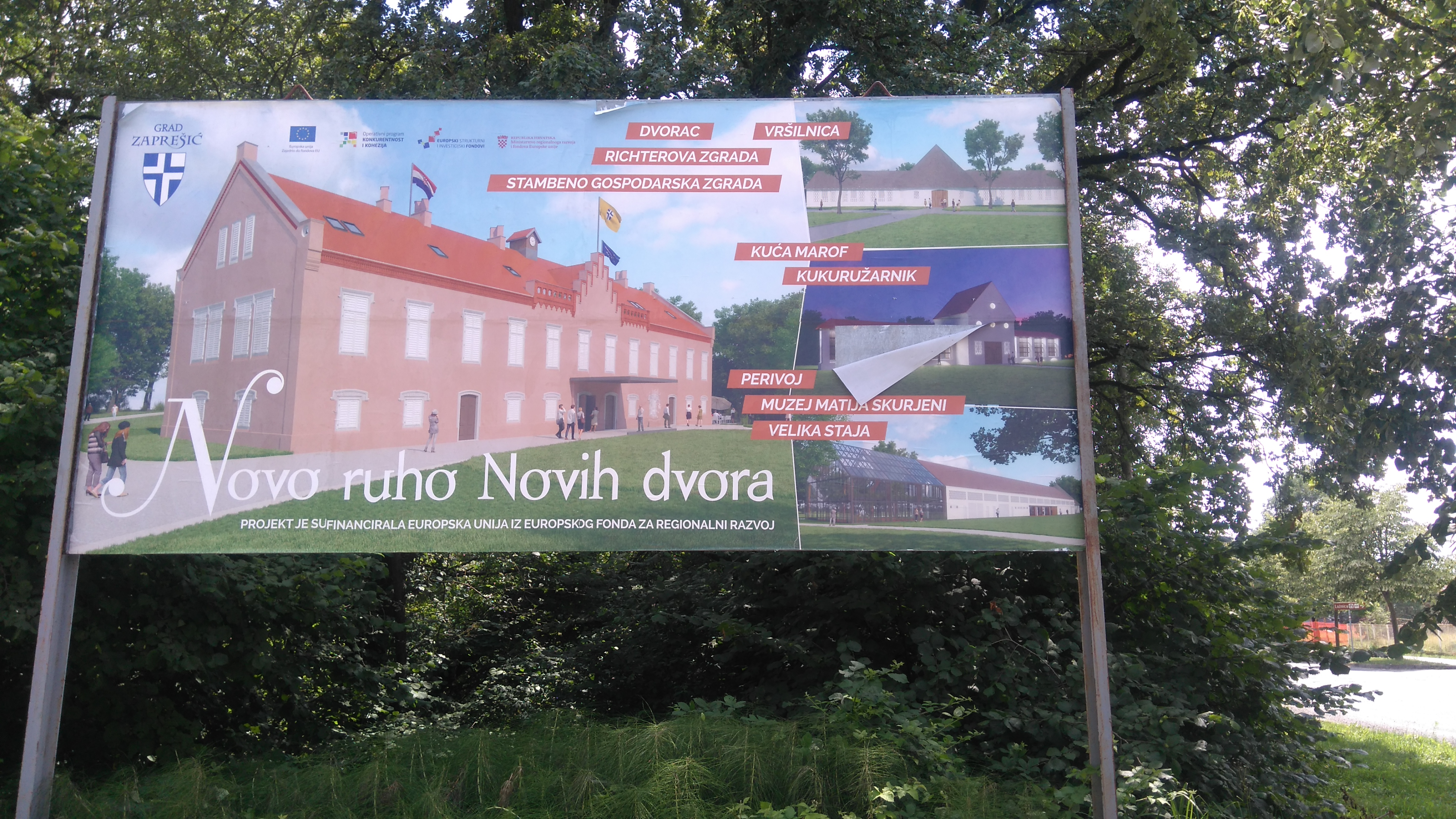
Billboard showing the looks of Novi Dvori manor and other buildings after the restoration

=== Contemporary period ===
In May 2017, it was announced that City of Zaprešić secured 40 million HRK from European Union funds in order to completely renovate the manor. After the restoration, the manor will be used as a residential space for ceremonial occasions and various exhibitions.

== Climate ==
From 1960 to 1991, the highest temperature recorded at the local weather station was 37.0 °C (98.6 °F), on 11 July 1968. The coldest temperature was −26.0 °C (−14.8 °F), on 17 January 1963.

== Gallery ==
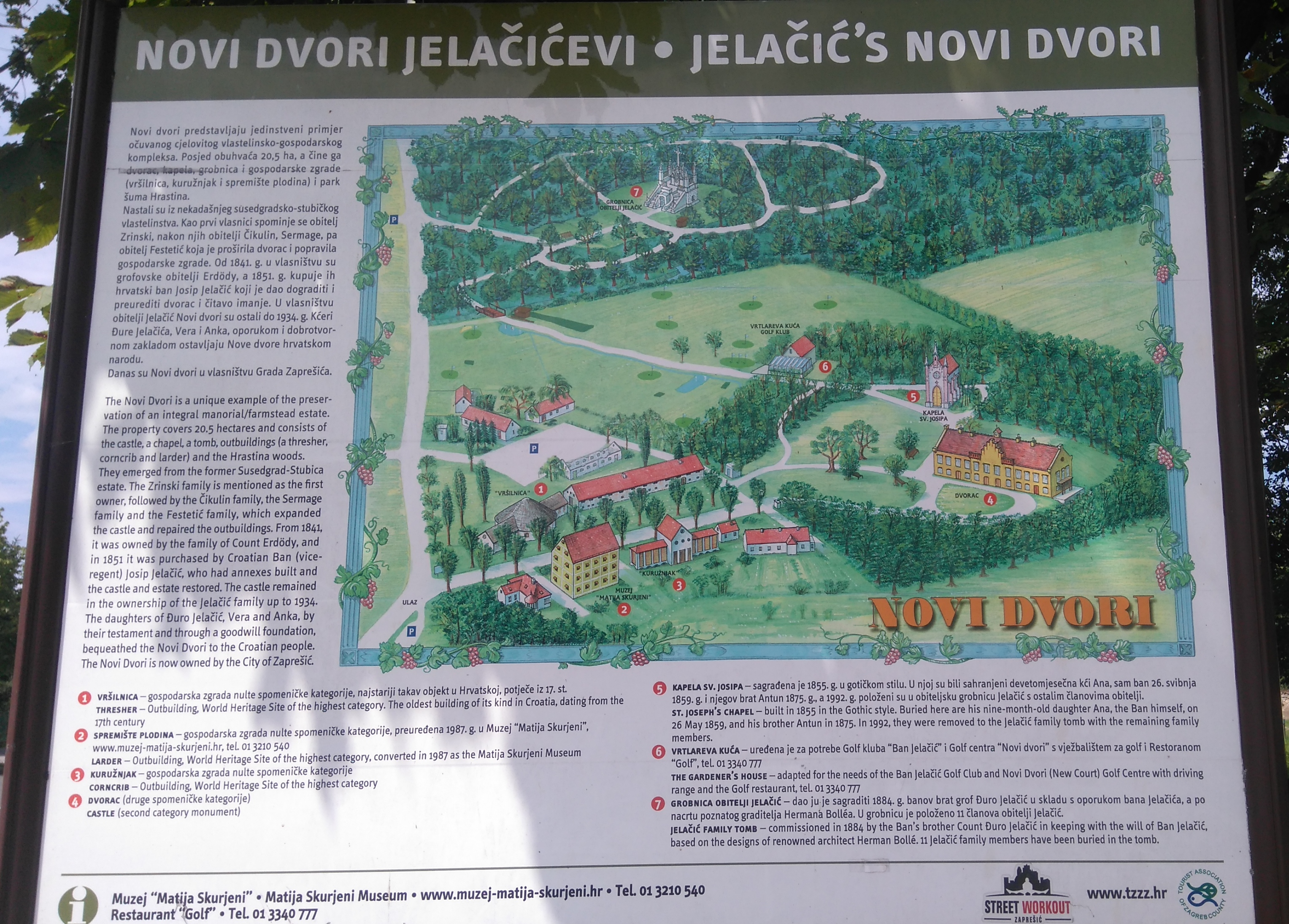
Illustrated Map of Novi Dvori Estate

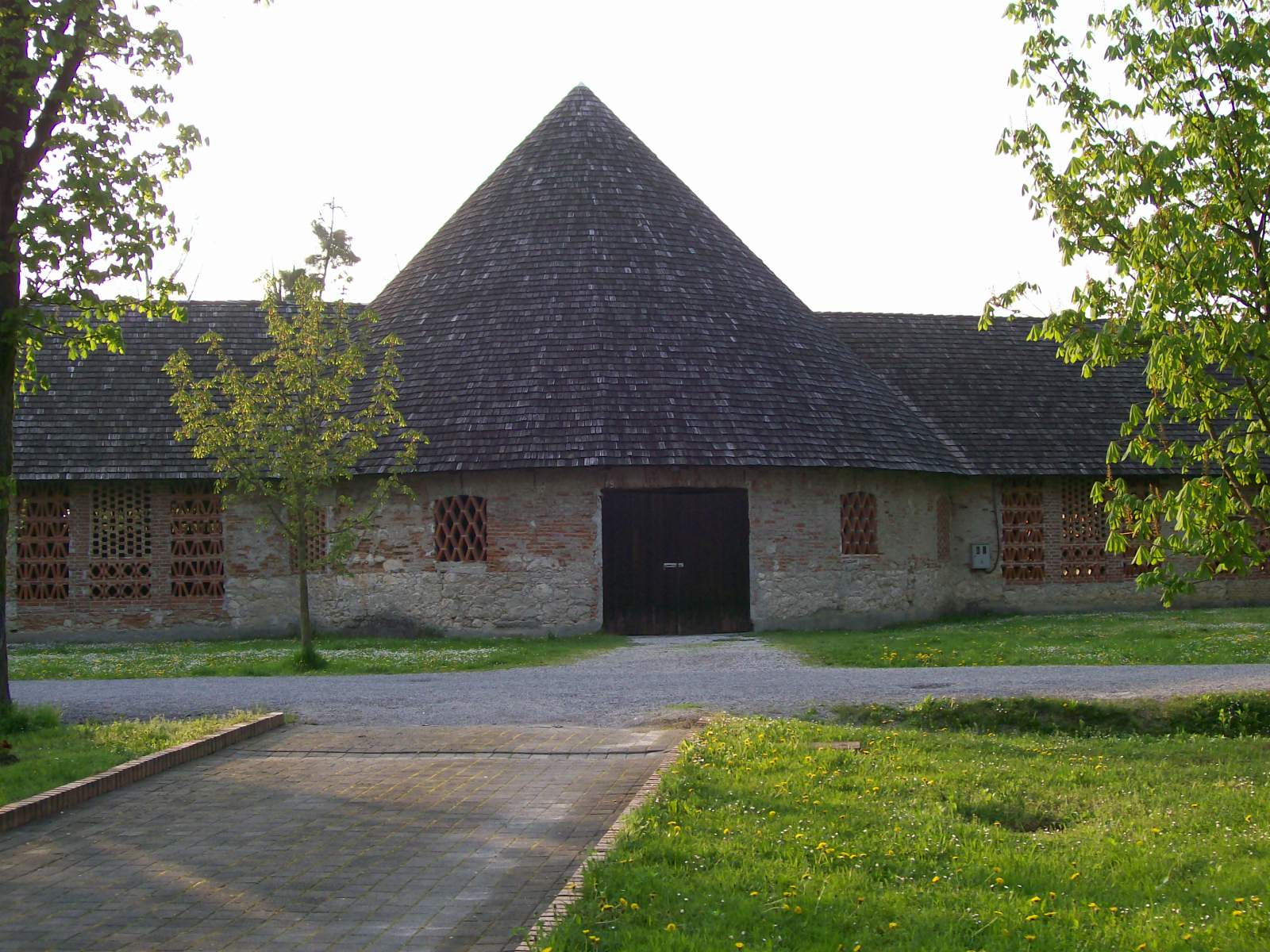
Circular threshing machine of Novi Dvori

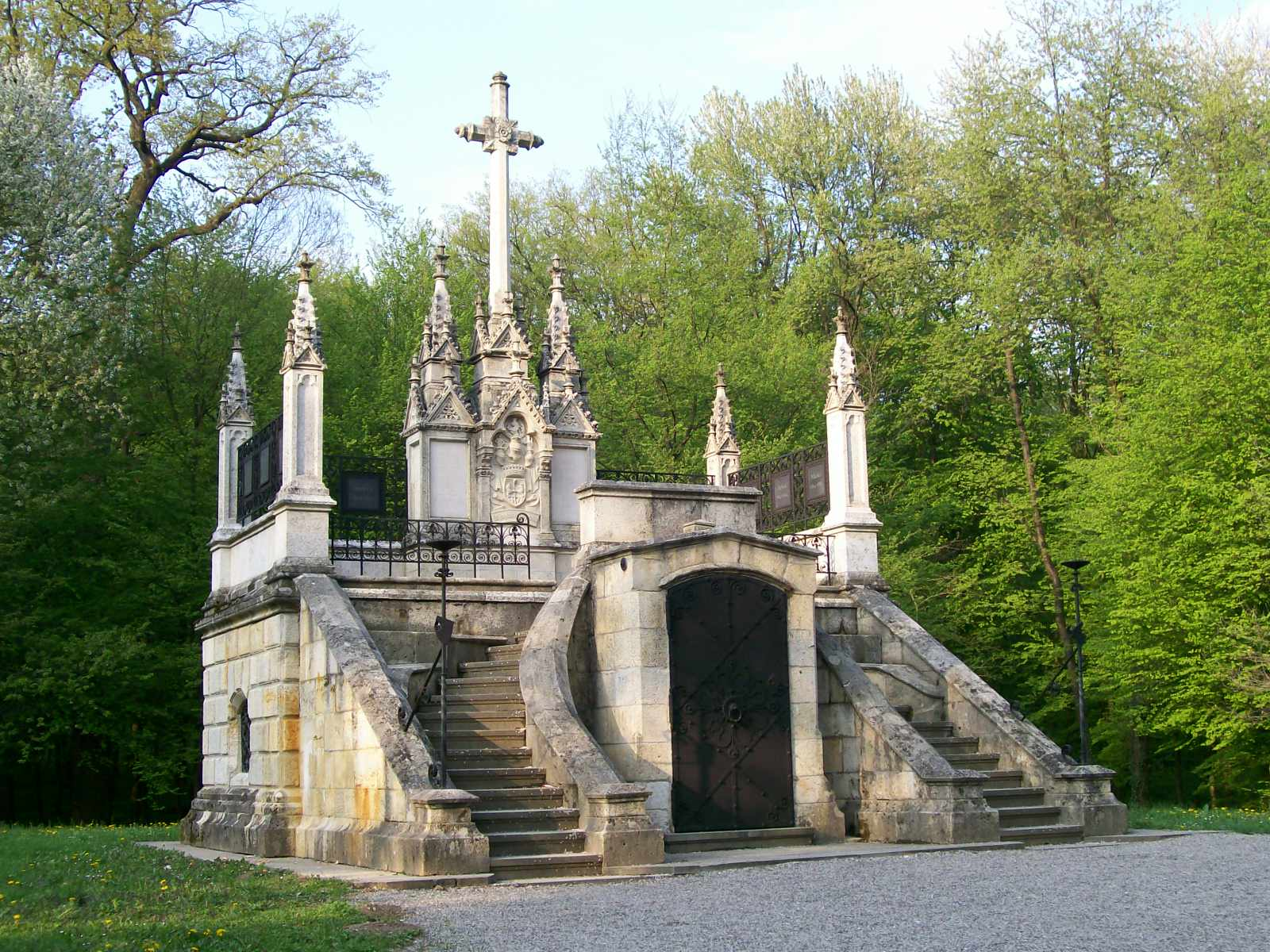
Jelačić family tomb

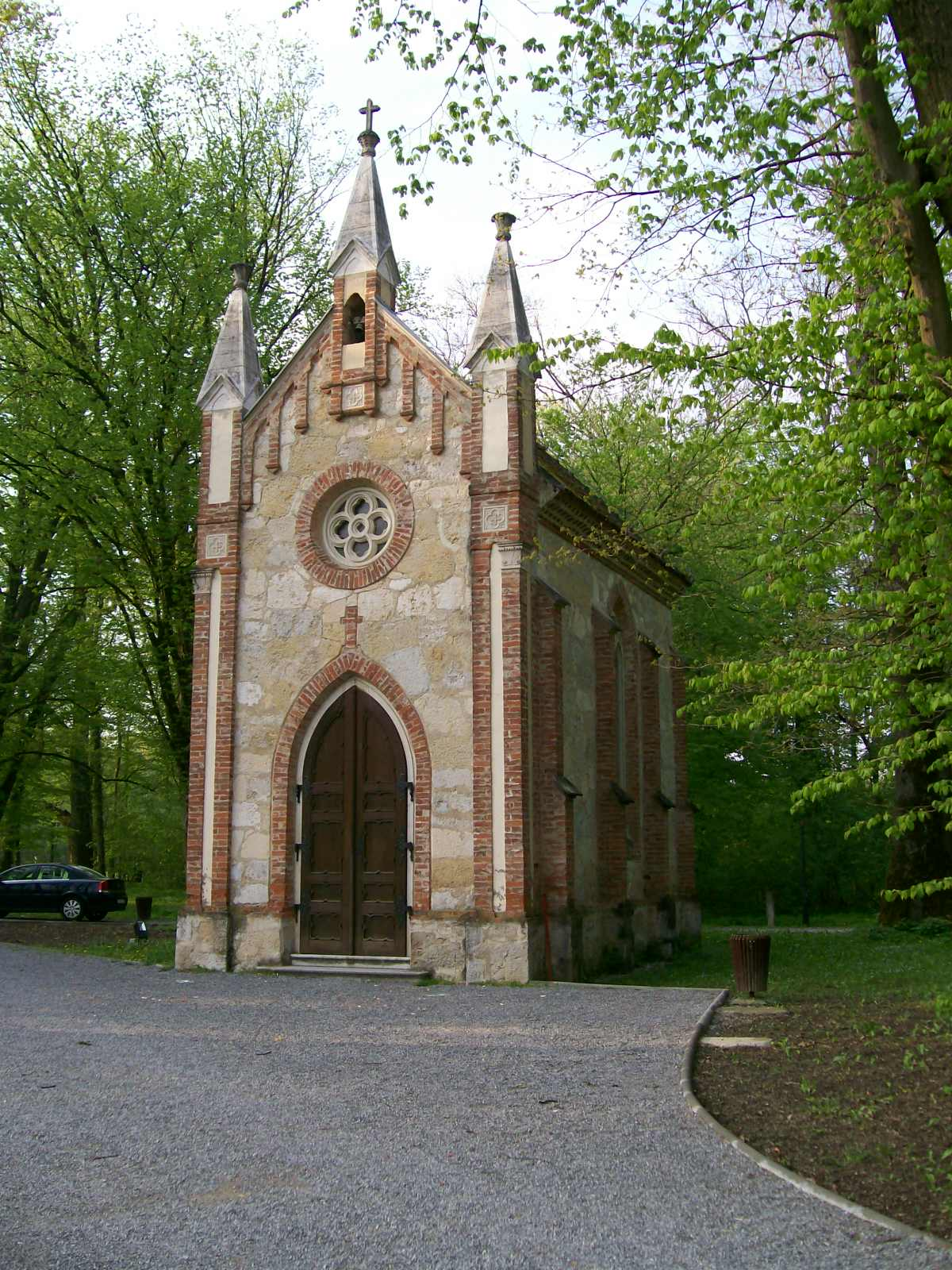
Neo-Gothic chapel built in 1855

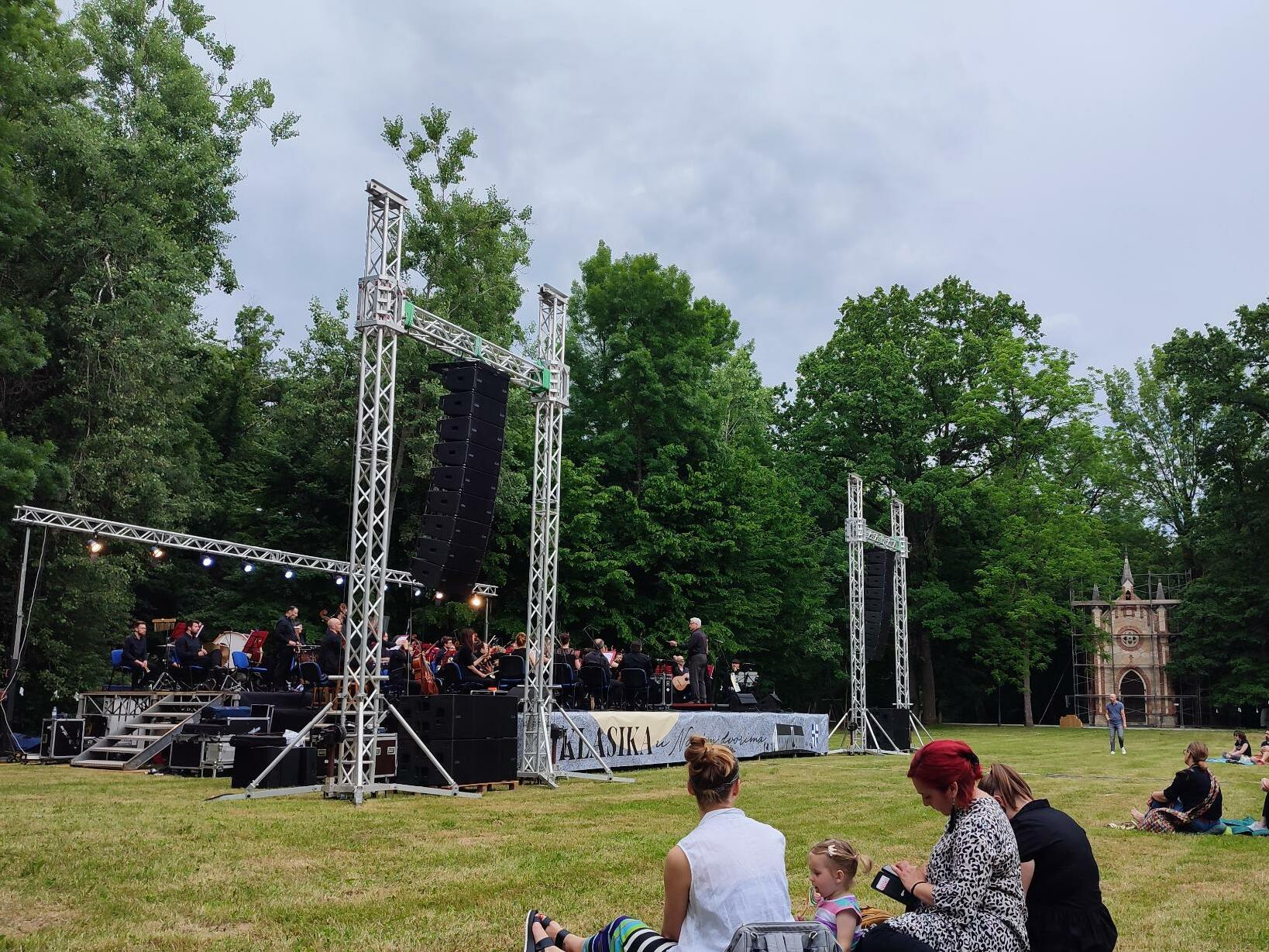
Zagreb Philharmonic Orchestra performing on the estate.

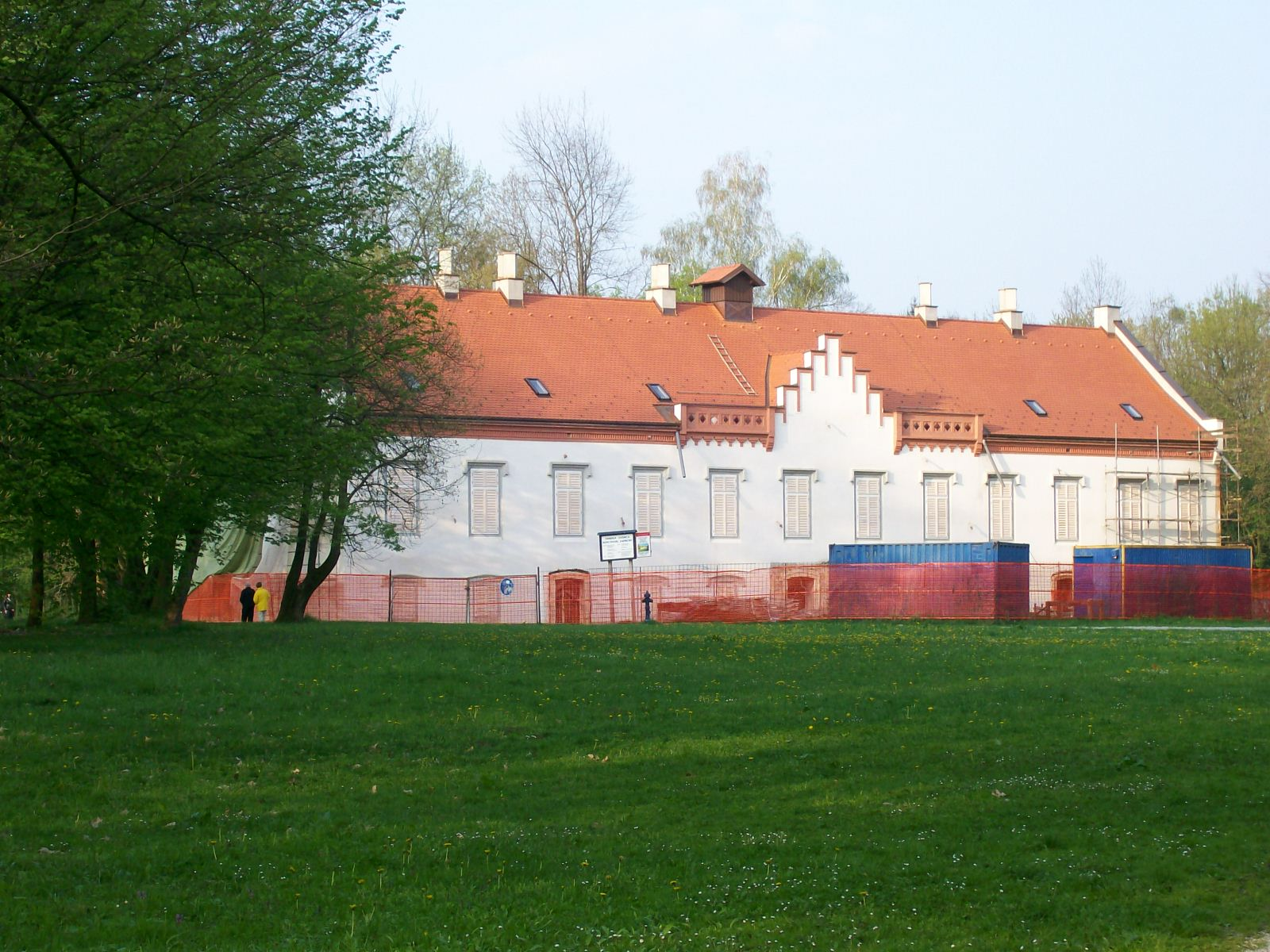
The manor during the reconstruction

== See also ==
- Susedgrad Castle

== Literature ==
- Obad Šćitaroci, Mladen; Bojanić Obad Šćitaroci, Bojana; Dundović, Boris (2013). "Manors and Gardens in Northern Croatia in the Age of Historicism" (PDF). Centropa. pp. 175–186. ISSN 1532-5563.
