= D225 road =

Road in Croatia

D225 state road

Route information
- Length: 14.8 km (9.2 mi)

Major junctions
- From: Harmica border crossing to Slovenia
- D1 in A2 Zaprešić interchange Ž1015 near Zagreb
- To: A2 in Zaprešić interchange

Location
- Country: Croatia
- Counties: Zagreb County, City of Zagreb
- Major cities: Zaprešić

Highway system
- Highways in Croatia

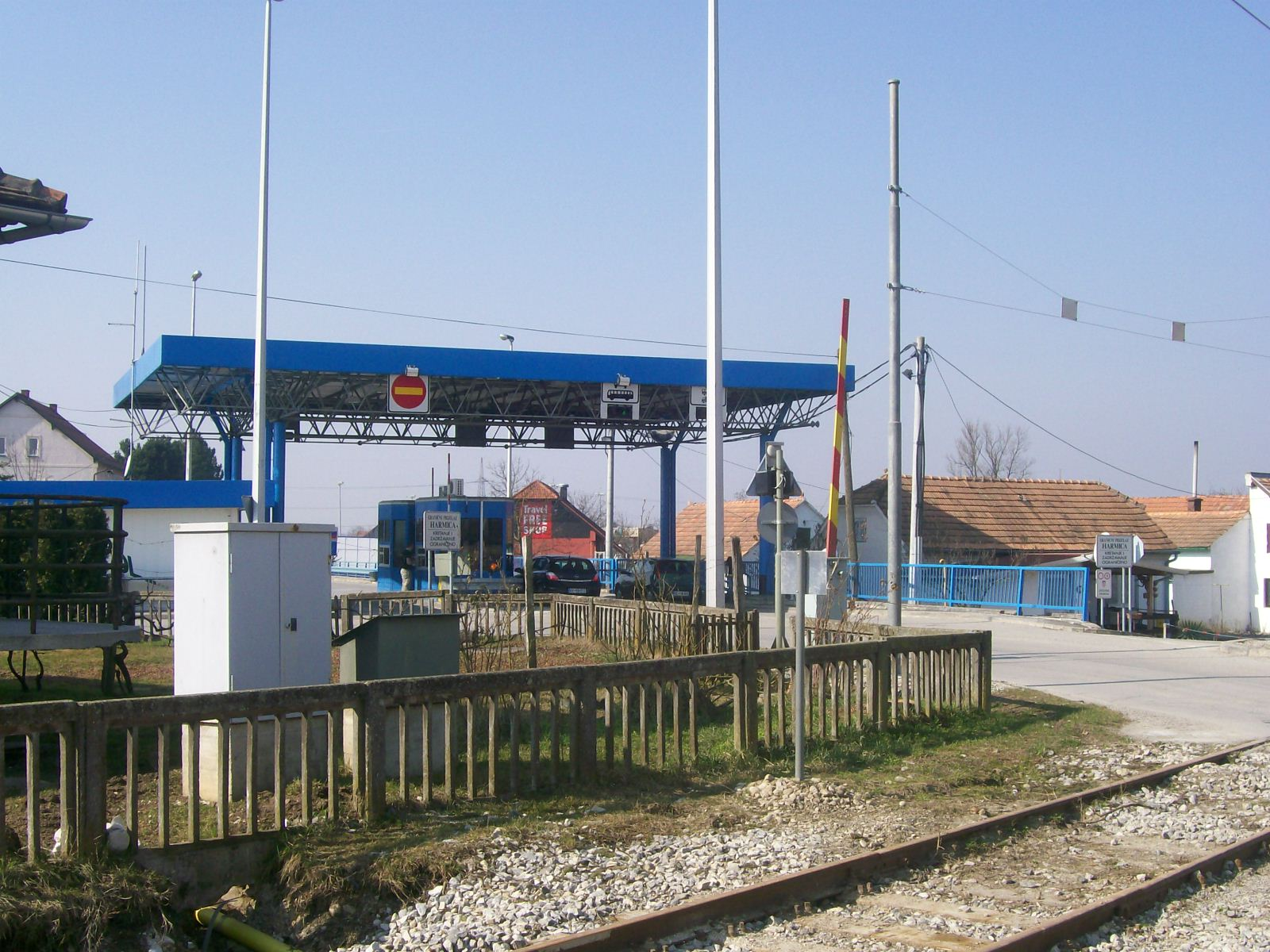
Harmica border crossing, at the western terminus of the D225 road

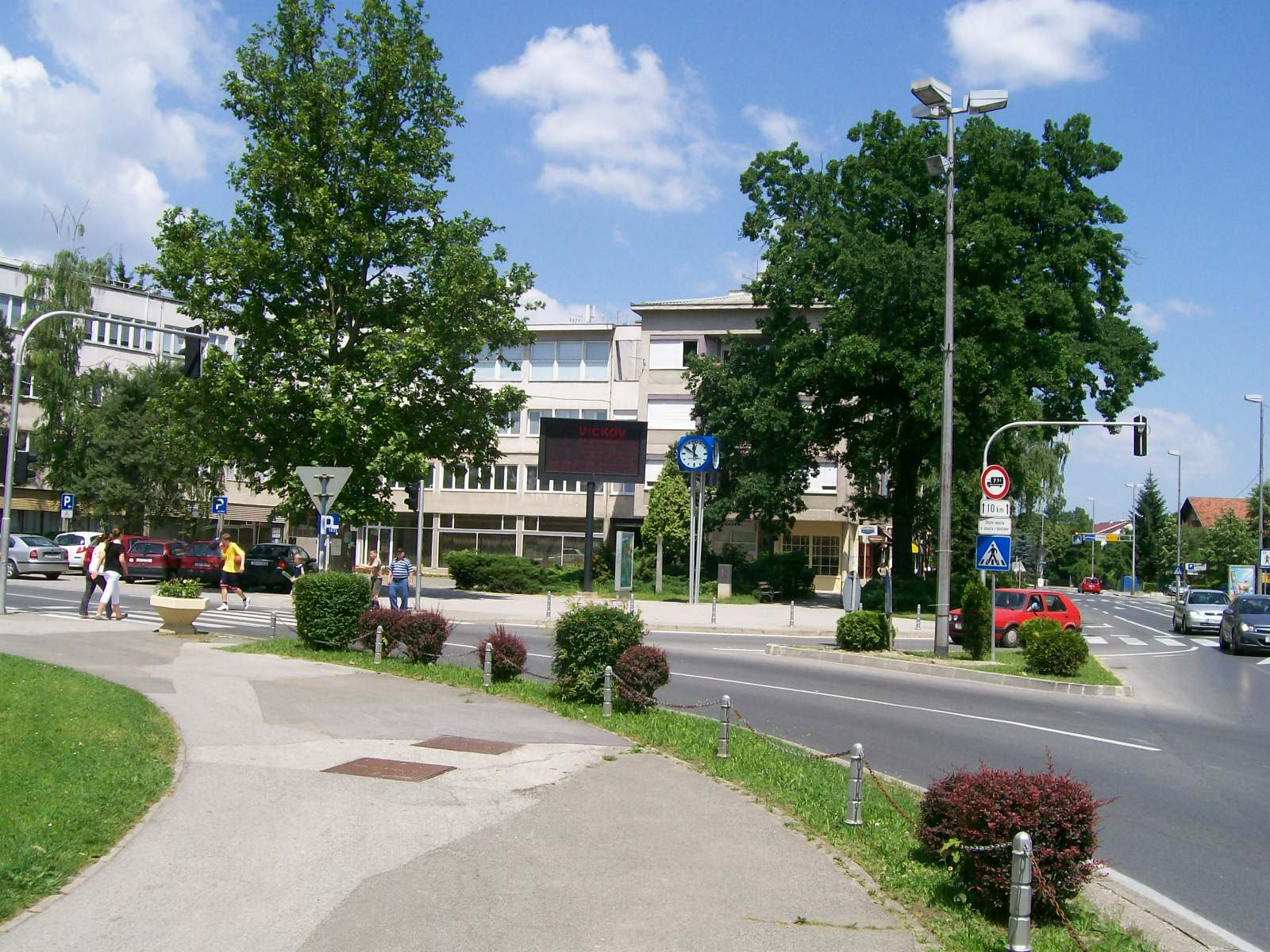
Zaprešić, on the D225 road route

D225 is a state road in the central Croatia connecting Harmica border crossing to Slovenia and the city of Zaprešić to the A2 motorway in Zaprešić interchange. The road is 14.8 km (9.2 mi) long.

As with all state roads in Croatia, the D225 is managed and maintained by Hrvatske ceste, a state-owned company.

== Traffic volume ==
Traffic is regularly counted and reported by Hrvatske ceste, operator of the road.

D225 traffic volume
Road	Counting site	AADT	ASDT	Notes
D225	1924 Šenkovec – east	4,285	6,903	Adjacent to the Ž3033 junction.
D225	1925 Zaprešić – east	24,180	23,510	Adjacent to the D1 junction.

== Road junctions and populated areas ==
D225 junctions/populated areas
Type	Slip roads/Notes
	Harmica border crossing to Slovenia. The route extends to Dobova, Slovenia. The western terminus of the road.
	Harmica; Ž3005 to Vukovo Selo and Dubravica.
	Ž3033 to Šenkovec.
	Gornji Laduč; Ž3035 to Prudnice.
	Prigorje Brdovečko
	Ž3030 to Trstenik, Marija Gorica and Donja Pušča.
	Brdovec; Ž3035 to Prudnice.
	Šibice
	Zaprešić; Ž2186 to Dubravica, Kraljevec na Sutli and Mihanovićev Dol (D205).
	Ž1015 to Zagreb via Aleja Bologne and Ilica.
	Jarek Donji
	Ivanec Bistranski; Ž2220 to Novaki Bistranski, Gornja Bistra and Strmec Stubički.
	A2 in Zaprešić interchange to Krapina (to the north) and to the A3 motorway Jankomir interchange (to the south). D1 to Zabok and Sveti Križ Začretje. The eastern terminus of the road.
