= Brdovec =

Municipality in Zagreb County, Croatia

- Municipality
- Općina Brdovec
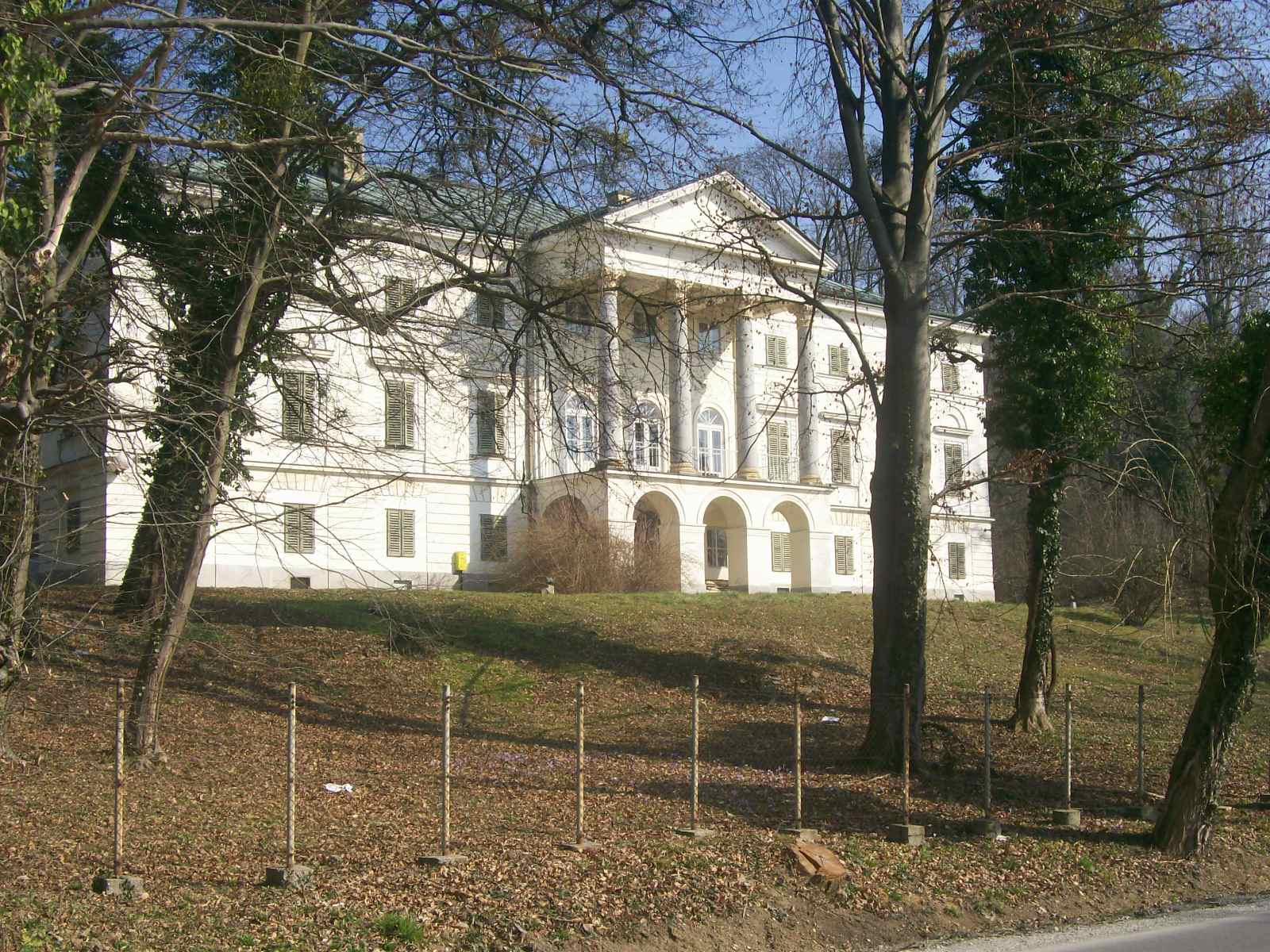
- Januševec Castle

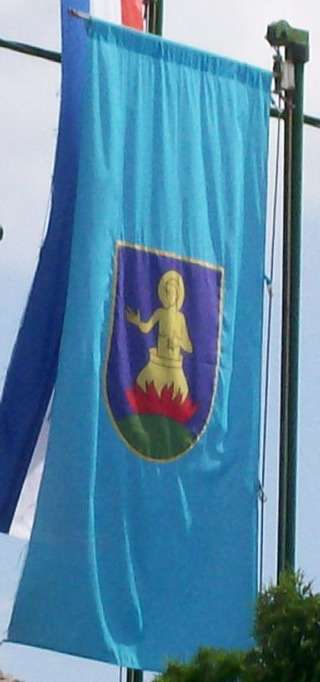
- Flag
- Interactive map of Brdovec
- Location of Brdovec in Croatia
- Coordinates: 45°52′N 15°46′E
- Country: Croatia
- Region: Central Croatia
- County: Zagreb County
- Settlements: 13 settlements: Brdovec (seat); Donji Laduč; Drenje Brdovečko; Gornji Laduč; Harmica; Javorje; Ključ Brdovečki; Prigorje Brdovečko; Prudnice; Savski Marof; Šenkovec; Vukovo Selo; Zdenci Brdovečki

Government
  - Mayor: Alen Prelec (SDP)

Area
  - Municipality: 37.2 km^{2} (14.4 sq mi)
  - Urban: 4.4 km^{2} (1.7 sq mi)

Population (2021)
  - Municipality: 10,737
  - Density: 289/km^{2} (748/sq mi)
  - Urban: 2,848
  - Urban density: 650/km^{2} (1,700/sq mi)
- Time zone: UTC+1 (CET)
  - Summer (DST): UTC+2 (CEST)
- Postal codes: 10291, 10292
- Area code: 01
- License plates: ZG
- Website: brdovec.hr

Brdovec is a municipality in the Zagreb County, Croatia. The closest town to Brdovec is neighboring Zaprešić on the east.

== Demographics ==
According to the 2001 census, there are 10,287 inhabitants, 92% which are Croats. They live in 13 settlements:

- Brdovec - 2,310
- Donji Laduč - 745
- Drenje Brdovečko - 694
- Gornji Laduč - 864
- Harmica - 232
- Javorje - 634
- Ključ Brdovečki - 663
- Prigorje Brdovečko - 1,258
- Prudnice - 641
- Savski Marof - 35
- Šenkovec - 733
- Vukovo Selo - 408
- Zdenci Brdovečki - 1,097

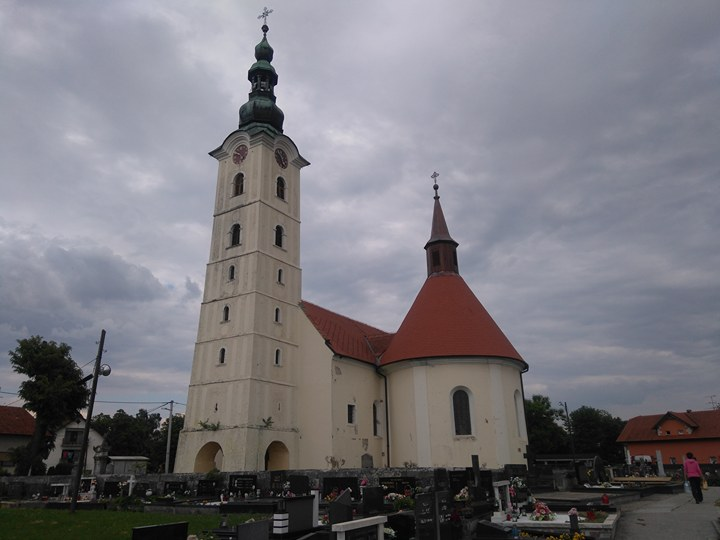
St. Vitus Church in Brdovec

=== Austro-Hungarian 1910 census ===
According to the 1910 census in Croatia, municipality of Brdovec had 4,021 inhabitants, which were linguistically and religiously declared as:

Municipality of Brdovec
| language | religion |
| total: 4,021: 1. Croatian 3,860 (96.0%); 2. Slovene 123 (3.05%); 3. Hungarian 12 (0.29%); 4. Czech 5 (0.12%); 5. Serbian 3 (0.07%); 6. German 2 (0.04%); 7. Italian 2 (0.04%); 8. others 14 (0.34%) | total: 4,021: 1. Rom. Cathol. 4,010 (99.7%); 2. Jewish 8 (0.19%); 3. Eastern Orthodox 3 (0.07%) |
