= Ključ =

Ključ is a Serbo-Croatian and Slovene word for key, as well as one of forms and transliterations of words for key in several other Slavic languages.

Ključ may also refer to:

== Places ==
=== Bosnia and Herzegovina ===
- Ključ, Una-Sana Canton, a town
- Ključ, Gacko, a village

=== Bulgaria ===
- Klyuch, a village also transliterated as Ključ

=== Croatia ===
- Ključ, Varaždin County, a village near Novi Marof
- Ključ, Šibenik-Knin County, a village near Drniš
- Ključ Brdovečki, a village near Brdovec

=== Serbia ===
- Ključ (Belgrade), a hamlet of Bečmen
- Ključ, Mionica, a village

== Other ==
- Ključ (film), a 1965 Croatian film
