= Dubravica, Zagreb County =

Dubravica
- Municipality
- Općina Dubravica
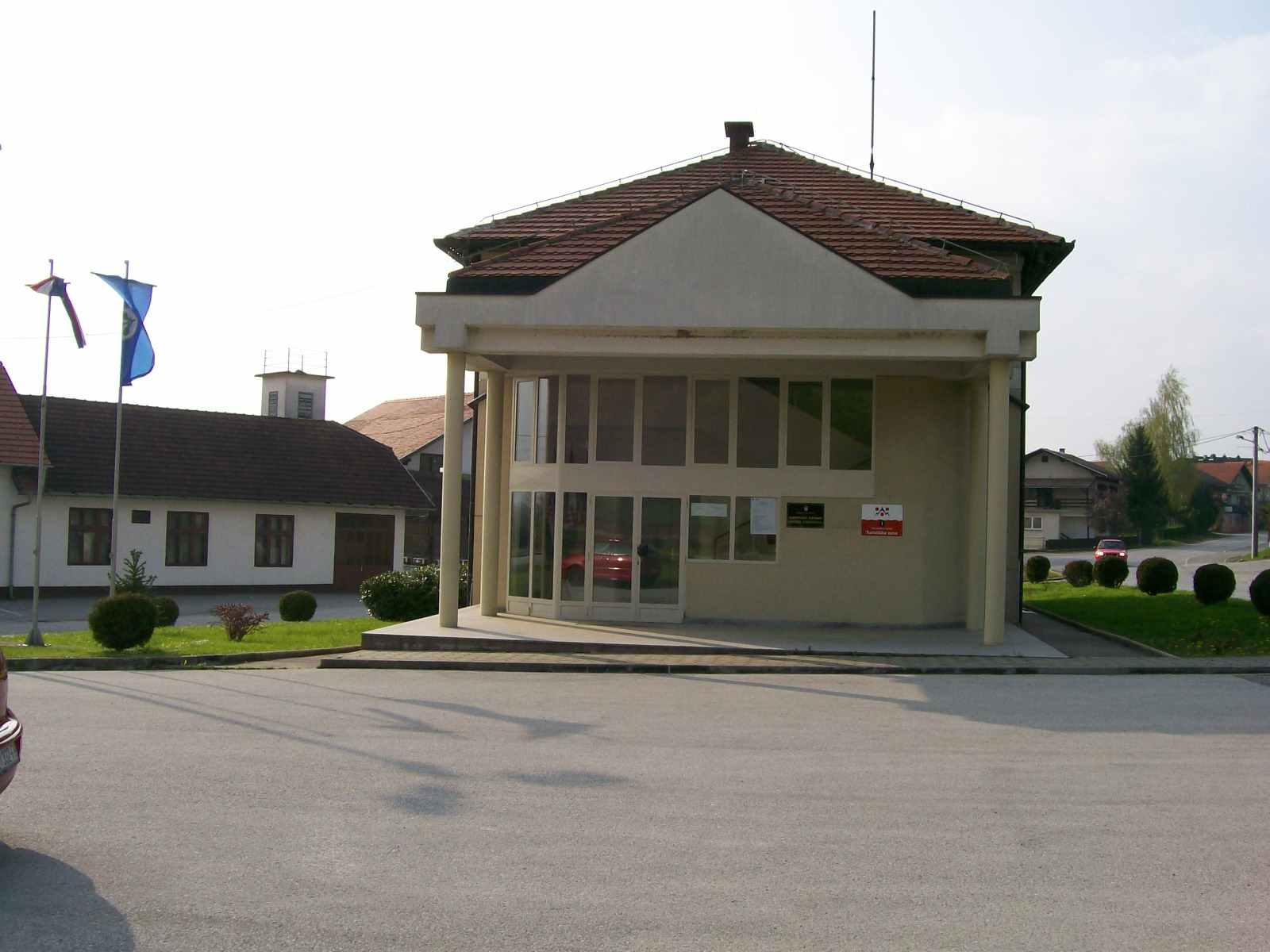
- The seat of the municipality Dubravica

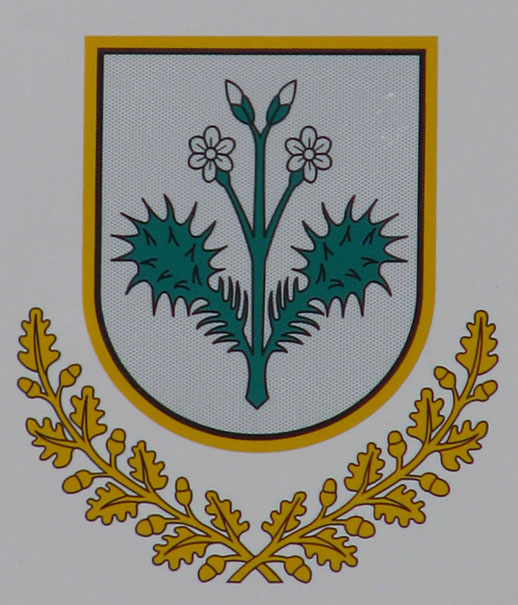
- Coat of arms

- Location of Dubravica in Croatia
- Coordinates: 45°57′36″N 15°42′58″E
- Country: Croatia
- Region: Central Croatia
- County: Zagreb County
- Settlements: 10 settlements: Bobovec Rozganski; Donji Čemehovec; Dubravica (seat); Kraj Gornji; Lugarski Breg; Lukavec Sutlanski; Pologi; Prosinec; Rozga; Vučilčevo

Government
  - Mayor: Franjo Štos

Area
  - Municipality: 20.6 km^{2} (8.0 sq mi)
  - Urban: 1.5 km^{2} (0.58 sq mi)

Population (2021)
  - Municipality: 1,192
  - Density: 57.9/km^{2} (150/sq mi)
  - Urban: 112
  - Urban density: 75/km^{2} (190/sq mi)
- Time zone: UTC+1 (CET)
  - Summer (DST): UTC+2 (CEST)
- Postal codes: 10293
- Area code: 01
- License plates: ZG
- Website: dubravica.hr

Dubravica is a municipality in Zagreb County, Croatia. According to the 2001 census, there are 1,586 inhabitants, absolute majority of which are Croats.

== Geography ==
Dubravica municipality is located in the northwestern part of Zagreb County.

From the north it borders with the Krapina-Zagorje County and the municipality of Kraljevec na Sutli, the municipality of Luka and the city of Zaprešić, the southeast part of the Pušća municipality, on the south by the municipality of Marija Gorica, while the west washes the Sutla river where is the border with Slovenia.

In the west, the municipality covers a large part of the fertile valley, and its eastern parts are picturesque gentle hills of Zagorje and Prigorje.

== Origin of name ==
The name Dubravica itself originates from an oak forest Dubrava, which was once covered the entire area, and even today it is not uncommon to find a typical forest plants such as wood anemone, or saffron, and the occasional oak tree in the meadows in the valley of the river Sutla.

== Settlements ==
- Bobovec Rozganski
- Donji Čemehovec
- Dubravica
- Kraj Gornji
- Lugarski Breg
- Lukavec Sutlanski
- Pologi
- Prosinec
- Rozga
- Vučilčevo

=== Austro-hungarian 1910 census ===
According to the 1910 census, municipality of Dubravica had 2,448 inhabitants, which were linguistically and religiously declared as this:

Municipality of Dubravica
language	religion
ukupno: 2,448: 1. Croatian 2,417 (98.7%); 2. Slovene 26 (1.06%); 3. German 4 (0.16%); 4. Italian 1 (0.04%)	total: 2,448: 1. Rom. Cathol. 2,441 (99.7%); 2. Jewish 7 (0.28%)

== Notable people from Dubravica ==
- Pavao Štoos, a Croatian poet, priest and a revivalist, born in Dubravica
