= Vraniczany Manor =

- Dvorac Vraniczany (Croatian)
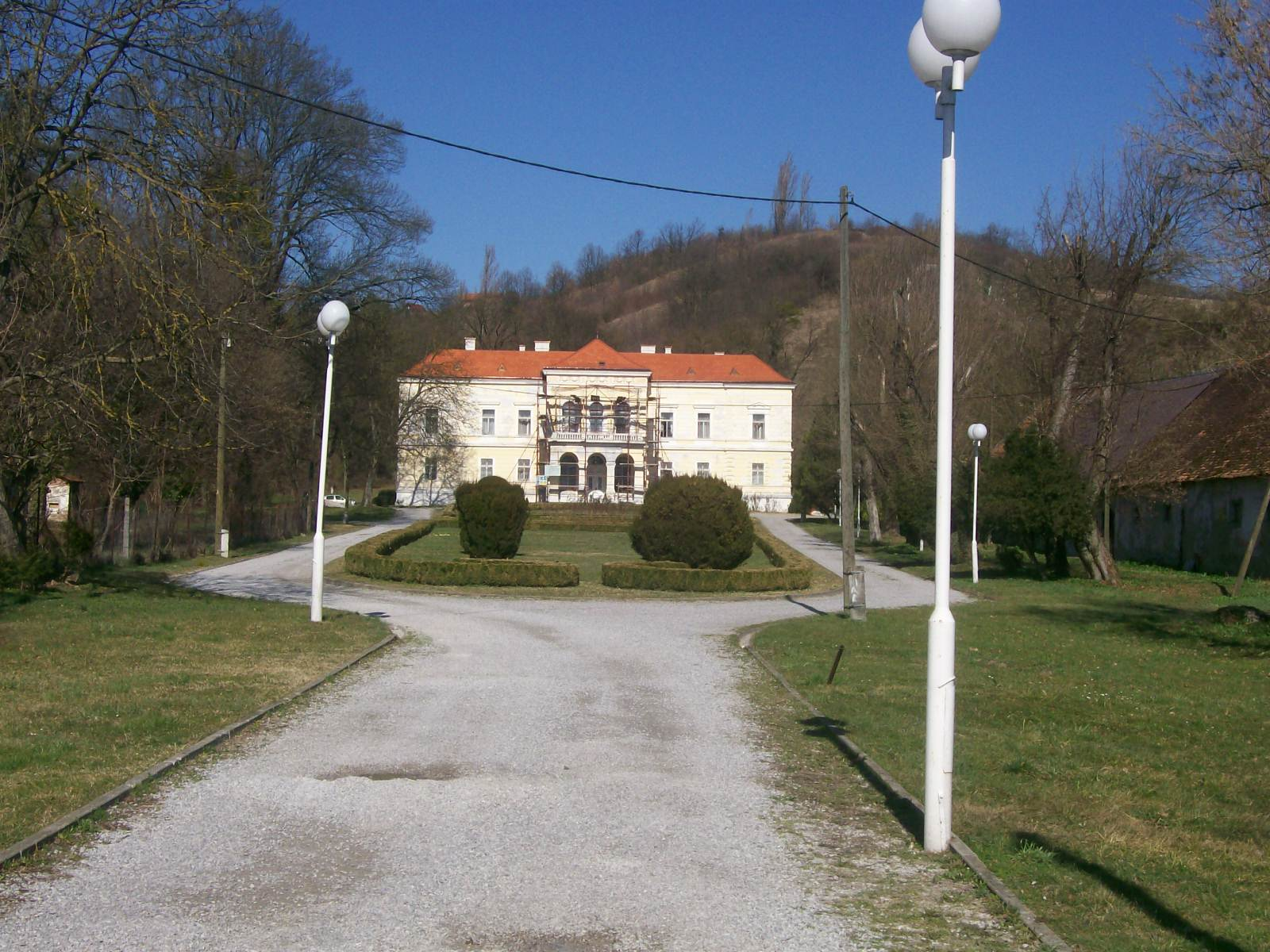
- Interactive map of Vraniczany Manor
- 45°53′10.68″N 15°42′32.40″E
- Location: Gornji Laduč, Croatia

History
- Built: c. 1890–1910

Site notes
- Architectural style: Neo-Renaissance

Cultural Good of Croatia
- Official name: Dvorac Vraniczany
- Type: Protected cultural good
- Reference no.: Z-2255

Vraniczany Manor (Croatian: Dvorac Vraniczany), also known as Laduč Manor (Croatian: Dvorac Laduč), is a neo-Renaissance manor in Gornji Laduč, Zagreb County, Croatia. It lies near the city of Zaprešić, in the Hrvatsko Zagorje region northwest of Zagreb. The manor currently houses a social-care institution for children. It is protected as a cultural good of the Republic of Croatia, classified as a residential building.

== History ==
The estate is recorded from the 17th century, when a noble curia stood on the site. The present manor was built at the turn of the 20th century (around 1890–1910) on the site of the former Stari Dvori. Its last owners were the barons Vranyczany-Dobrinović family, and the last mistress of the estate was baroness Tilda Vranyczány-Dobrinović. The family held a prominent place in the economic, political and cultural life of Croatia during the 19th century.

== Architecture ==
The manor stands at the transition between the Sava plain and the southern slopes of the Marija Gorica hills, near the Slovenian border, surrounded by a landscaped park.

It was built on the site of an older Baroque curia as a single-storey building on an irregular U-shaped plan, with an elongated main southern wing whose central section is emphasised by an portico-balcony with three arched openings on the ground floor and an iron structure on the upper floor. Its architectural detailing shows the stylistic features of the neo-Renaissance. The spatial arrangement is dominated by an axial concept, and an atrium with a grand staircase occupies the central part of the ground floor. The salon ceilings were painted by Ivan Druzani. The manor belongs to a manorial complex, with a range of outbuildings at the front of the estate and a park of geometrically arranged parterre greenery together with a landscape park and a lake at the rear.
