= Pologi =

Pologi may refer to:

- Pologi, Ukraine, a city near Zaporizhzhia
- Pologi, Croatia, a village near Zaprešić
