= Januševec Castle =

- Dvorac Januševec (Croatian)
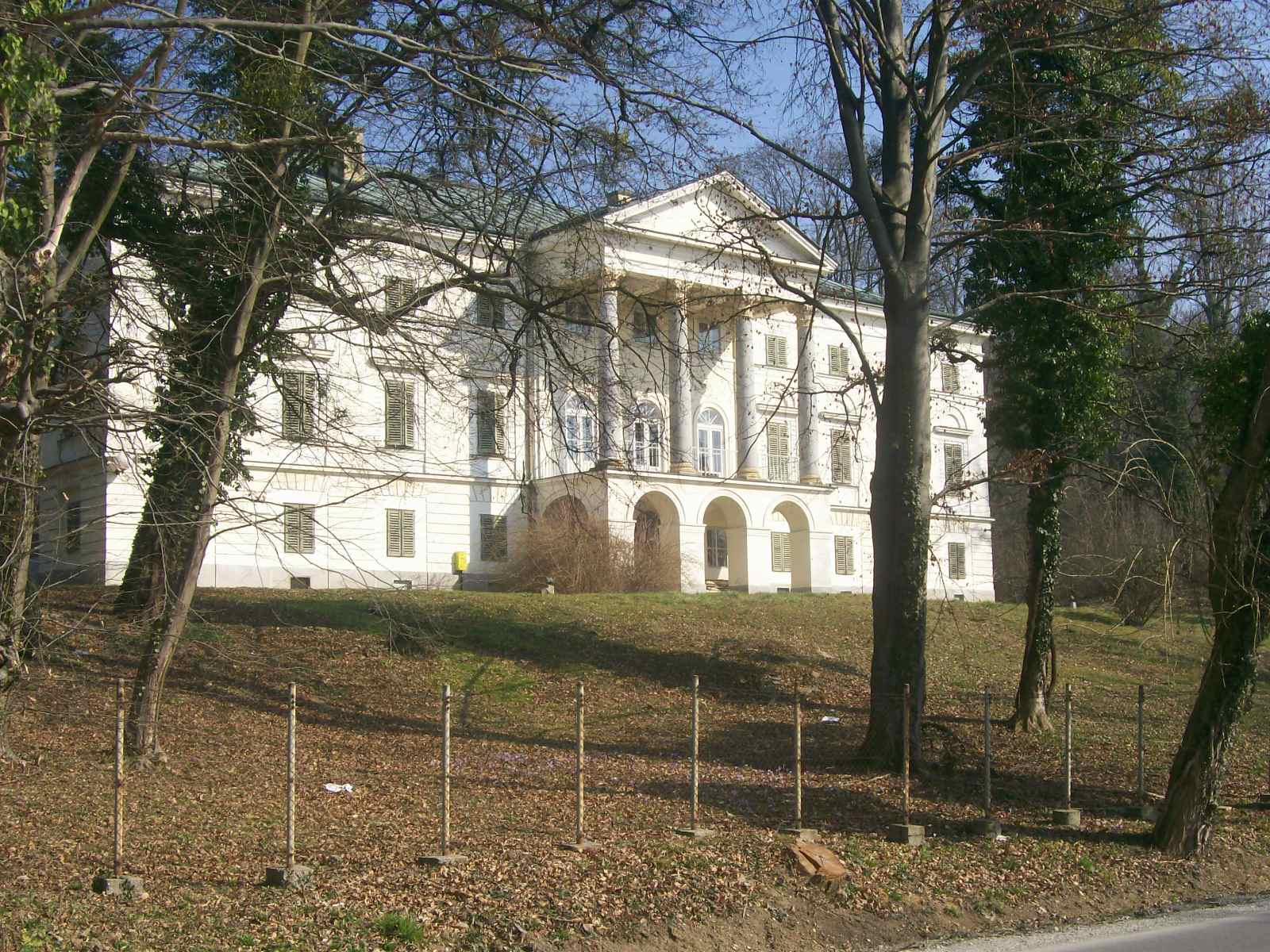
- Interactive map of Januševec Castle
- 45°52′35.6″N 15°44′47.7″E
- Location: Prigorje Brdovečko, Croatia

History
- Built: c. 1828

Site notes
- Architectural style: Classicism

Cultural Good of Croatia
- Official name: Dvorac Januševec
- Type: Protected cultural good
- Reference no.: Z-2251

Januševec Castle (Croatian: Dvorac Januševec) is a classicist manor in Prigorje Brdovečko, Zagreb County, Croatia. It lies near the city of Zaprešić, in the Hrvatsko Zagorje region northwest of Zagreb. Built around 1828, it is often described as one of the finest works of classicist architecture in Croatia. The building is protected as a cultural good of the Republic of Croatia. Today the castle serves as a repository of the Croatian State Archives.

== History ==
Januševec Castle was built around 1828 for Baron Joseph von Werklein (Croatian: Josip Vrkljan; 1777–1849), probably to a design by the noted Zagreb architect Bartol Felbinger. The architect of the building is not established with certainty: while Felbinger produced several designs for Januševec that were never realized, the construction itself was directed by the Zagreb master builder Angelo Chicco.

During the Second World War, the castle was mined and heavily damaged by retreating Ustaše forces, following the massacre of Roma and Sinti they had committed in the nearby village of Hrastina. It was restored between 1962 and 1970.

== Architecture ==
The building has a rectangular ground plan and rises through two stories. At its center stands a circular hall, or rotunda, which extends through the full height of the structure and is crowned by a dome; the rooms of both floors are grouped around this central space. One facade is articulated by a large loggia, while two others carry columned terraces.
