= Drenje Brdovečko =

- Location within Croatia
- Coordinates: 45°52′12″N 15°42′29″E
- Country: Croatia
- County: Zagreb County
- Municipality: Brdovec

Area
  - Total: 7.0 km^{2} (2.7 sq mi)

Population (2021)
  - Total: 587
  - Density: 84/km^{2} (220/sq mi)
- Time zone: UTC+1 (CET)
  - Summer (DST): UTC+2 (CEST)

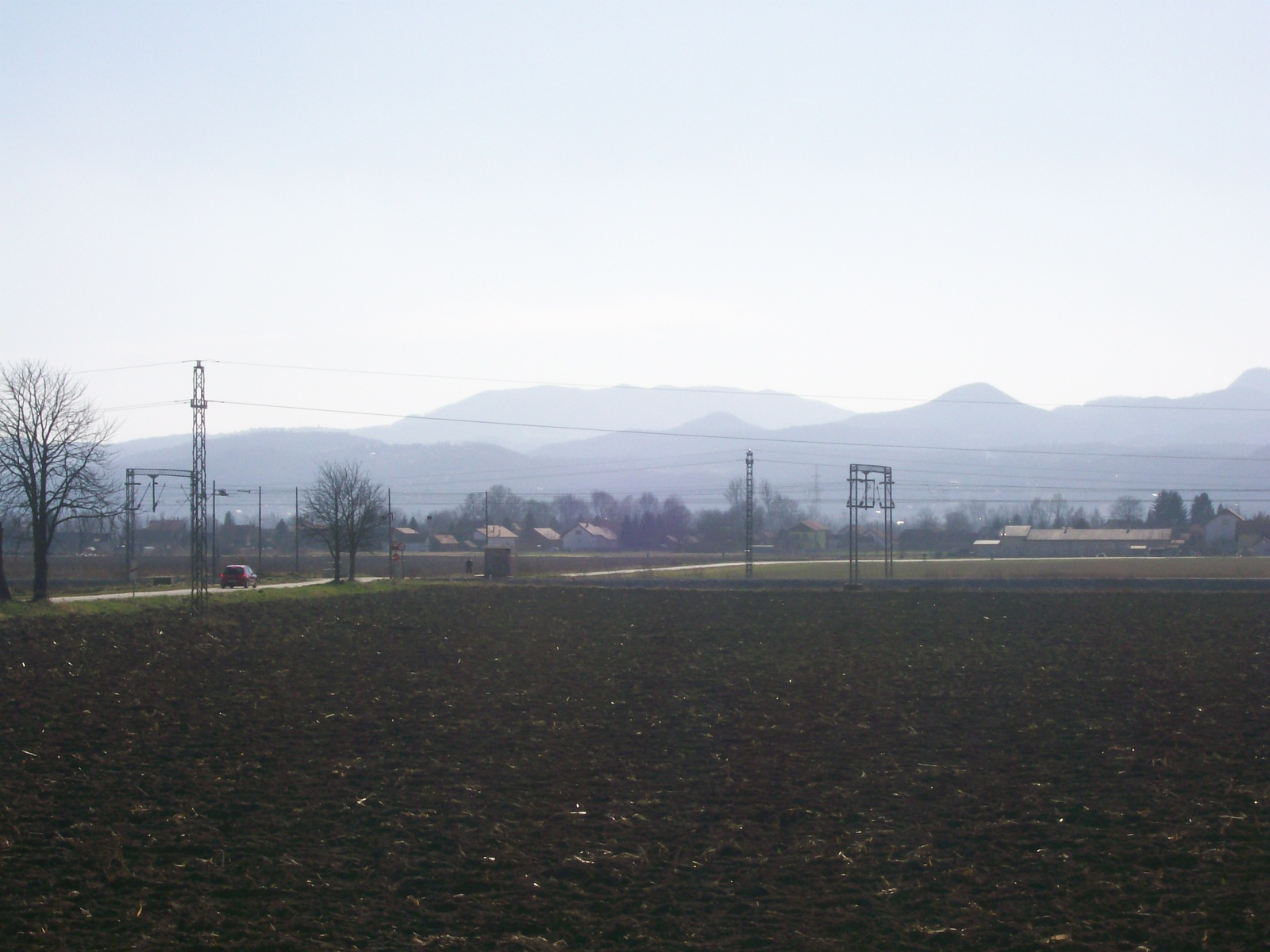
Drenje Brdovečko

Drenje Brdovečko is a small settlement near Brdovec, Zagreb County. It has a total land area of 7.13 km^{2}. According to the 2011 census, it has a population of 685.
