= Baltazar Adam Krčelić =

Croatian historian, theologian and jurist

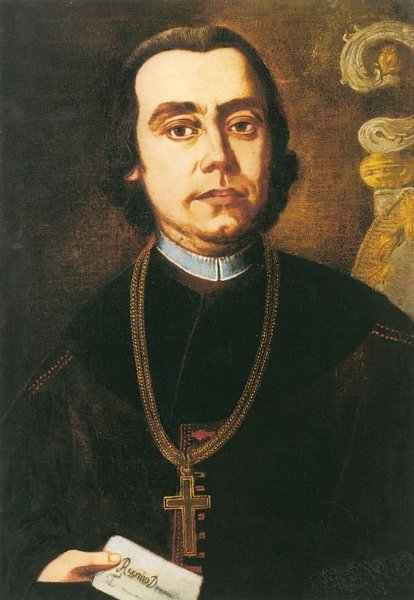
- Portrait
- Born: 5 February 1715; Šenkovec, near Zagreb, Kingdom of Croatia, Habsburg monarchy
- Died: 29 March 1778 (aged 63); Zagreb, Kingdom of Croatia, Habsburg Monarchy
- Occupations: Historian; Literary historian; Theologian; Lawyer

Baltazar Adam Krčelić (5 February 1715 – 29 March 1778) was a Croatian historian, theologian and lawyer. After Vitezović, he was the most prominent figure in the Croatian cultural life of the time.

== Biography ==
He was born in Šenkovec near Zagreb on 5 February 1715 and was schooled in Zagreb, Vienna and Bologna, where he gained a degree in theology and law. In 1747, he was the canon of Zagreb and rector of the Collegium Croaticum Viennense in Vienna. In 1755, at the prompting of the court in Vienna, he composed a draft for the administrative reform in Croatia. His first published work is the biography of medieval Bishop of Zagreb Augustin Kažotić, which was written in Kajkavian. In 1754, he completed a major work of eclessial history of Zagreb, publishing it in 1770, which was later used by Daniele Farlati. His yearbook Annuae 1748–1767 is a precious source for the history of the period. Shortly before his death, he donated his books and manuscripts to the library of the Royal Academy in Zagreb, which was a precursor to today's National and University Library in Zagreb. He died in Zagreb on 29 March 1778.

== Works ==
- 1747. Živlenje blaženoga Gazotti Augustina, zagrebečkoga biskupa.
- 1767. Naivrednesze sztalnoszti pelda: Poglaviti i prechasztni goszpon, goszpon Januss Busan […] po prodeke poglavitoga goszp. Bolthisara Adama Kerchelich de Corbavia, opata Szveteh apostolov Petra i Paula de Kacs, sztolne zagrebechke czirkve kanovnika, i tabule, vu orszagu ovom, zagrebachke judiciariae assessora. Vu Zagrebu: po factoru Antonu Jandera.
- 1770. Historiarum cathedralis ecclesiae Zagrabiensis partis primae tomus primus.
- 1770. De Regnis Dalmatiae, Croatiae, Slavoniae notitiae praeliminares.
- 1772. Dusnosti szpunienie proti pokoinomu goszpodinu groffu Petru Troillu Sermage od Szomszedvara […] na dan anniversariuma ochivesto vuchinieno po razgovoru goszpodina Bolthisara Adama Kerchelich od Corbavie, sztolne zagrebechke czirkve kanovnika, opatta Sz. apostolov Petra i Paula de Kacs, jasprista zacheszanszkoga, tabule judiciarszke vu Horvaczkom i Sclavonszkom Krallesztvu kot Duhovnega sztola vu ove biskupie assessora: Vu letu 1772. dan aprila. Vu Zagrebu: Štampano po Antonu Jandera.
- 1901. Annuae sive historia ab anno inclusive 1748. et subsequis (1767) ad posteritatis notitiam.
