= Prigorje (disambiguation) =

Prigorje is a geographical subdivision of Croatia.

Prigorje may also refer to:

- Prigorje County, a county of the Independent State of Croatia
- Prigorje, Krapina-Zagorje County, a village near Đurmanec, Croatia
- Prigorje Brdovečko, Zagreb County, a village in Croatia
