= Prosinec =

Prosinec may refer to:

- Prosinec (month), a Slavic name for a winter month
- Prosinec, Croatia, a village near Dubravica
