= List of prefects of Zagreb County =

This is a list of prefects of Zagreb County.

== Prefects of Zagreb County (1993–present) ==
Croatian Democratic Union (HDZ)
Croatian Peasant Party (HSS)

№	Portrait	Name (Born–Died)	Term of Office		Party
1		Ivica Gaži (1936–2011)	4 May 1993	11 March 1996	HDZ
Merged into City of Zagreb (11 March 1996–5 June 1997)
2		Branimir Pasecky (1931–2022)	5 June 1997	24 July 2001	HDZ
3		Stjepan Kožić (1952–)	24 July 2001	Incumbent	HSS

== See also ==
- Zagreb County
