= Vukovo Selo =

Coordinates: 45°54′11″N 15°40′48″E

- Village
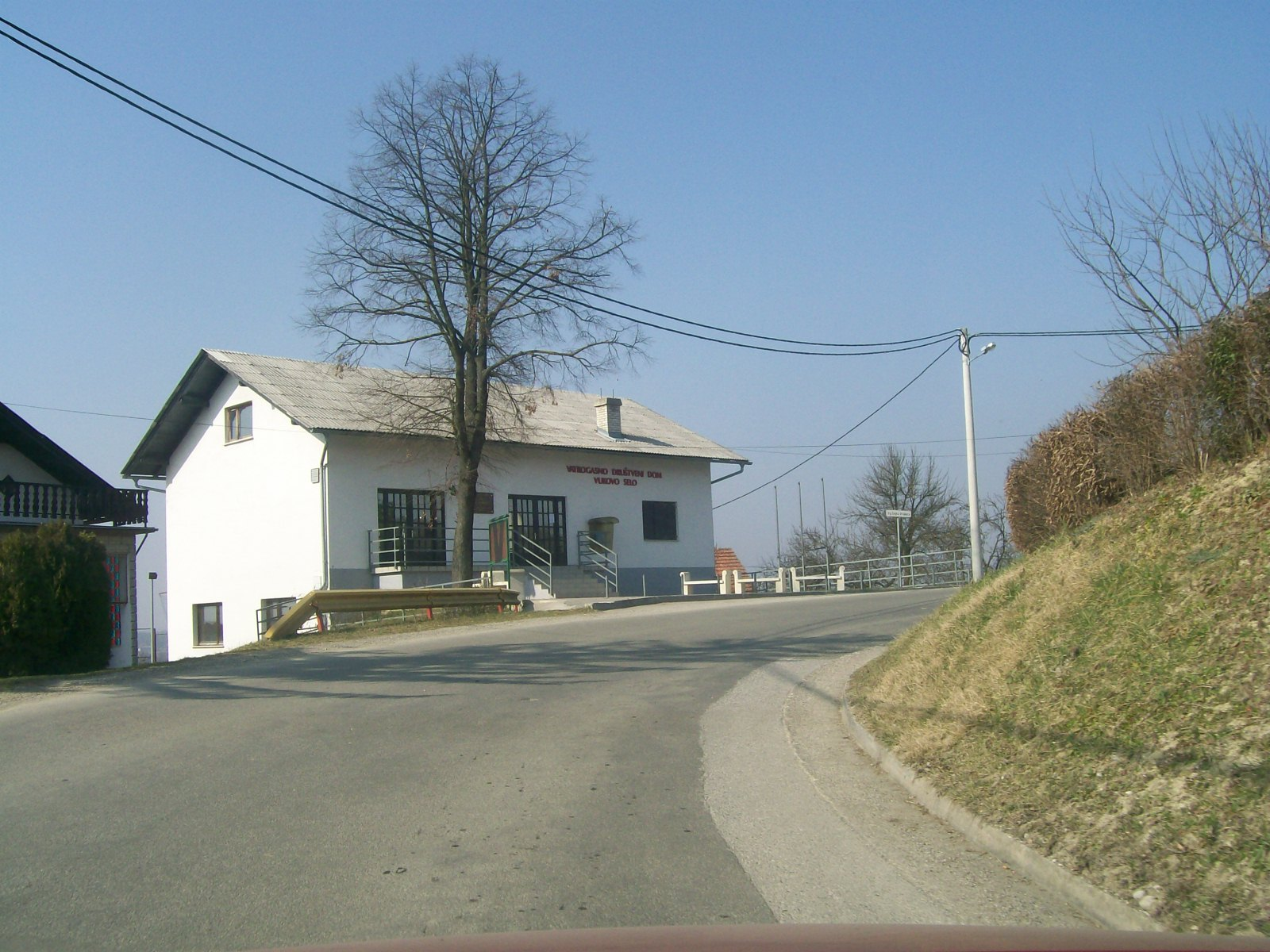
- Fire station in the center of the village of Vukovo Selo
- Interactive map of Vukovo Selo
- Country: Croatia
- County: Zagreb County

Area
  - Total: 1.9 km^{2} (0.73 sq mi)

Population (2021)
  - Total: 408
  - Density: 210/km^{2} (560/sq mi)
- Time zone: UTC+1 (CET)
  - Summer (DST): UTC+2 (CEST)

Vukovo Selo is a village in Croatia. It is part of Zagreb County and Brdovec municipality. It is located close to the border with Slovenia, on the left coast of the river Sutla. The village has a volunteer fire station and a train station which is currently out of order. There are no stores or healthcare institutions in the village.

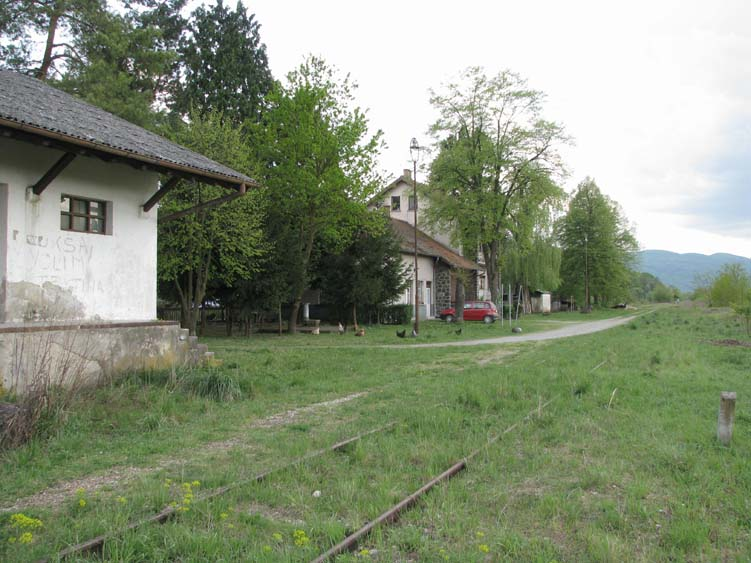
Vukovo Selo train station
