= Gornja Pušća =

Coordinates: 45°55′43″N 15°46′18″E

- Interactive map of Gornja Pušća

Gornja Pušća is a village in the municipality of Pušća, Zagreb County, Croatia. In the 2011 census, it had 605 inhabitants.
