= Ključ Brdovečki =

- Village
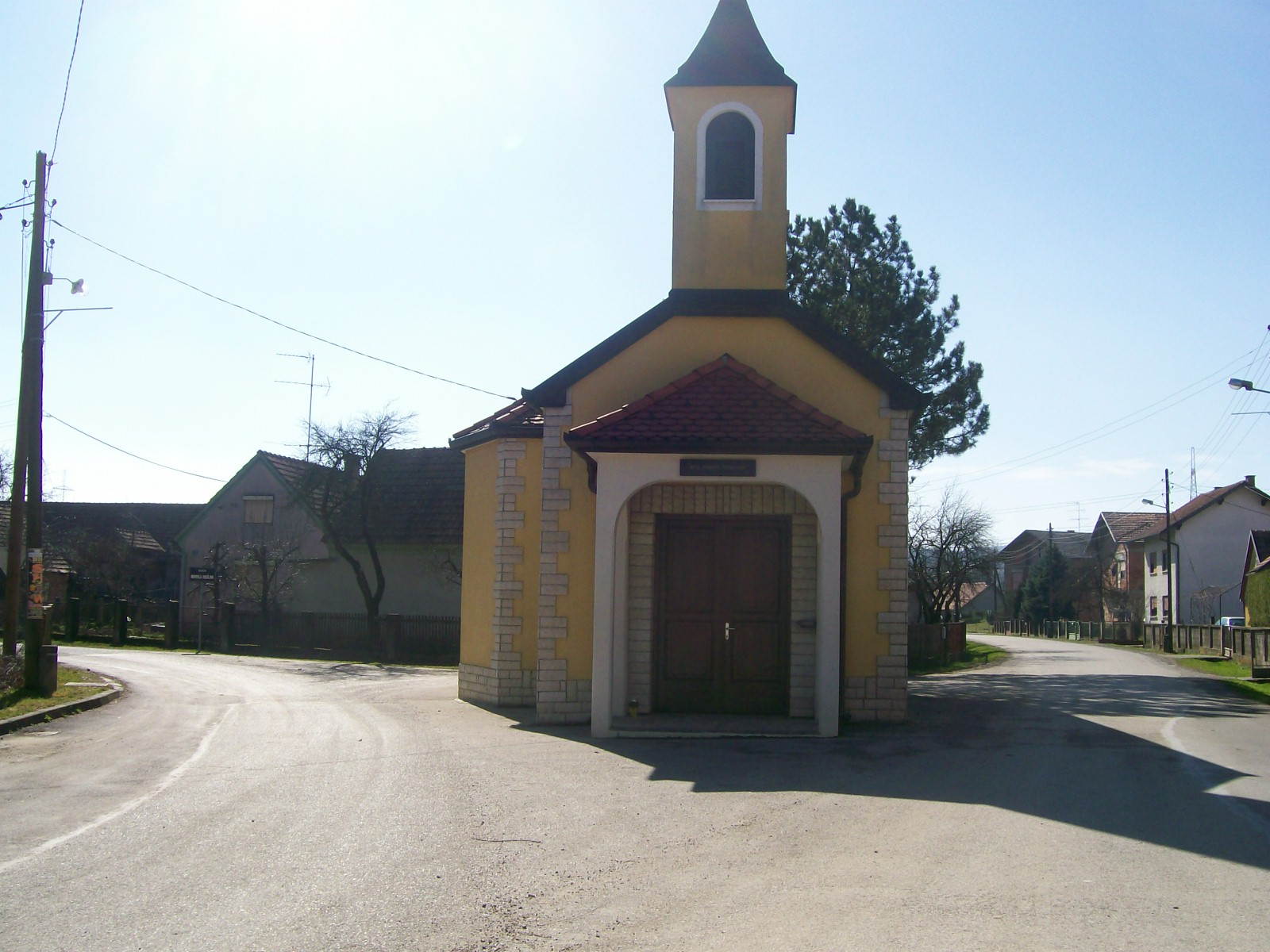
- Kapelica Kljuc Brdovecki

- Location within Croatia
- Coordinates: 45°52′N 15°42′E
- Country: Croatia
- County: Zagreb County
- Municipality: Brdovec

Area
  - Total: 3.2 km^{2} (1.2 sq mi)

Population (2021)
  - Total: 548
  - Density: 170/km^{2} (440/sq mi)
- Time zone: UTC+1 (CET)
  - Summer (DST): UTC+2 (CEST)
- Postal Code: 10292

Ključ Brdovečki is a naselje (settlement) in the municipality of Brdovec, Zagreb County, Croatia. According to the 2001 census, it has 663 inhabitants living in an area of 3.20 square kilometers (1.24 sq mi).

== History ==
The village became the site of a mass grave from May 23–25, 1945 when Axis soldiers were massacred there by the Yugoslav Partisans. The Wehrmacht had dug anti-tank trenches in the village, which were used to bury the dead. The mass grave was discovered in 2009. It is estimated that there are 4,000 bodies in the graves, with many of them being members of the 392nd (Croatian) Infantry Division (Wehrmacht).
