= Harmica, Zagreb County =

Harmica
- Village
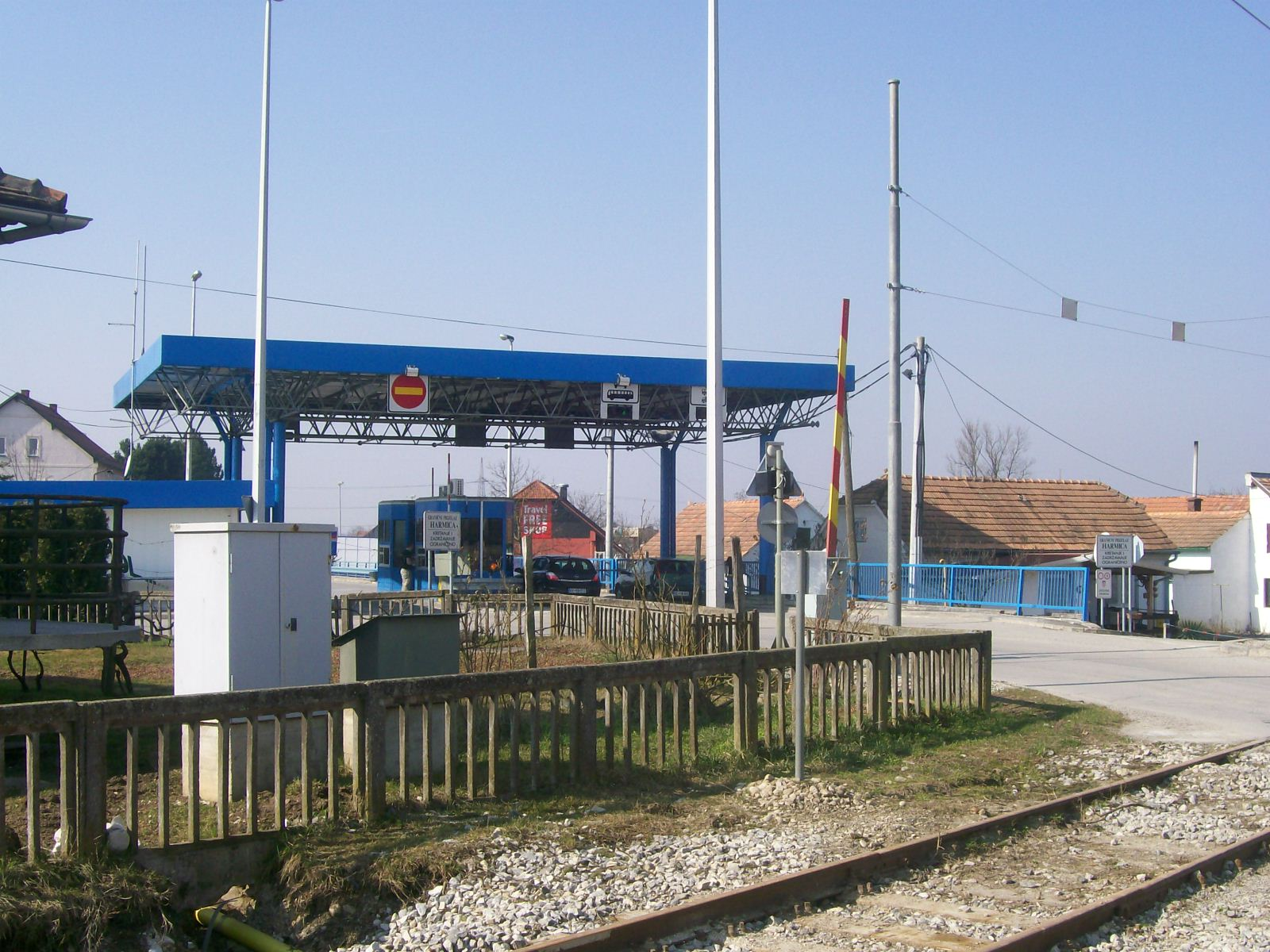

- Location within Croatia
- Coordinates: 45°53′N 15°42′E
- Country: Croatia
- County: Zagreb County

Area
  - Total: 0.6 km^{2} (0.23 sq mi)

Population (2021)
  - Total: 245
  - Density: 410/km^{2} (1,100/sq mi)
- Time zone: UTC+1 (CET)
  - Summer (DST): UTC+2 (CEST)

Harmica (pronounced [xǎrmit͡sa]) is a settlement in Croatia, located on the border with Slovenia. It is connected by the D225 highway. The eponymous border crossing is also located in Harmica, connecting Croatia's D225 with Slovenia's R2-420.

== Notable people ==
- Ivan Perkovac (1826–1871), journalist, editor of Pozor and Vijenac, member of parliament, secretary of Matica hrvatska
