= Pologi, Croatia =

Settlement in Zagreb County, Croatia

Pologi
- Settlement
- Interactive map of Pologi
- Location of Pologi in Croatia
- Coordinates: 45°56′13″N 15°44′06″E
- Country: Croatia
- County: Zagreb County
- Municipality: Dubravica

Area
  - Total: 0.9 km^{2} (0.35 sq mi)

Population (2021)
  - Total: 71
  - Density: 79/km^{2} (200/sq mi)
- Time zone: UTC+1 (CET)
  - Summer (DST): UTC+2 (CEST)
- Postal code: 10292 Šenkovec
- Area code: +385 (0)1

Pologi is a settlement in the Municipality of Dubravica in Croatia. In 2021, its population was 71.

== Demographics ==
Pologi: Population trends 1857–2021
v

population	103	108	122	121	113	162	161	193	203	175	162	102	131	85	100	103	71
	1857	1869	1880	1890	1900	1910	1921	1931	1948	1953	1961	1971	1981	1991	2001	2011	2021

Sources: Croatian Bureau of Statistics publications
