= Prosinec, Croatia =

Settlement in Zagreb County, Croatia

Prosinec
- Settlement
- Interactive map of Prosinec
- Location of Prosinec in Croatia
- Coordinates: 45°58′05″N 15°42′58″E
- Country: Croatia
- County: Zagreb County
- Municipality: Dubravica

Area
  - Total: 0.7 km^{2} (0.27 sq mi)

Population (2021)
  - Total: 85
  - Density: 120/km^{2} (310/sq mi)
- Time zone: UTC+1 (CET)
  - Summer (DST): UTC+2 (CEST)
- Postal code: 10292 Šenkovec
- Area code: +385 (0)1

Prosinec is a settlement in the Municipality of Dubravica in Croatia. In 2021, its population was 85.

== Demographics ==
Prosinec: Population trends 1857–2021
v

| population | 133 | 122 | 130 | 152 | 150 | 195 | 175 | 187 | 164 | 163 | 155 | 132 | 134 | 116 | 112 | 94 | 85 |
| | 1857 | 1869 | 1880 | 1890 | 1900 | 1910 | 1921 | 1931 | 1948 | 1953 | 1961 | 1971 | 1981 | 1991 | 2001 | 2011 | 2021 |

Sources: Croatian Bureau of Statistics publications
