= Gornji Laduč =

Coordinates: 45°53′N 15°44′E

- Village
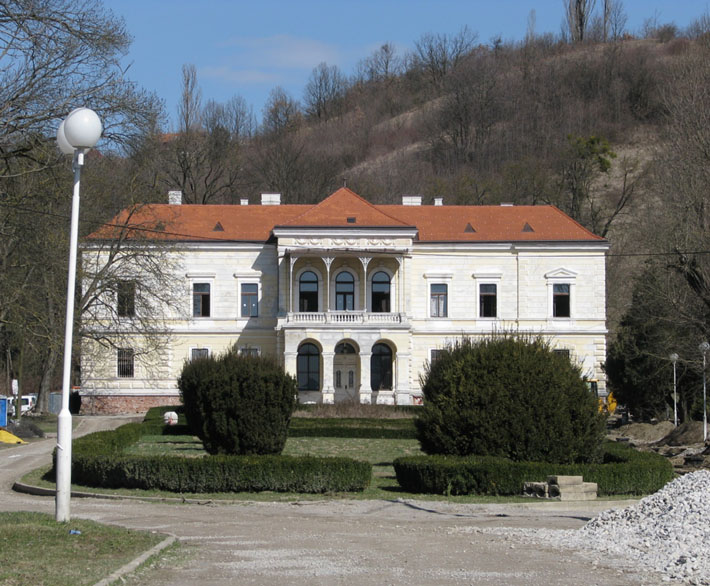
- Laduč manor
- Interactive map of Gornji Laduč
- Country: Croatia
- County: Zagreb County
- Municipality: Brdovec

Area
  - Total: 1.7 km^{2} (0.66 sq mi)

Population (2021)
  - Total: 788
  - Density: 460/km^{2} (1,200/sq mi)
- Time zone: UTC+1 (CET)
  - Summer (DST): UTC+2 (CEST)

Gornji Laduč is a village in Croatia. It is connected by the D225 highway.

== Literature ==
- Obad Šćitaroci, Mladen; Bojanić Obad Šćitaroci, Bojana; Dundović, Boris (2013). "Manors and Gardens in Northern Croatia in the Age of Historicism" (PDF). Centropa. pp. 175–186. ISSN 1532-5563. Archived from the original (PDF) on 2025-05-05.
