= Donja Pušća =

Donja Pušča
- Village
- Location within Croatia
- Coordinates: 45°55′N 15°47′E
- Country: Croatia
- County: Zagreb County
- Municipality: Pušća

Area
  - Total: 3.2 km^{2} (1.2 sq mi)

Population (2021)
  - Total: 846
  - Density: 260/km^{2} (680/sq mi)
- Time zone: UTC+1 (CET)
  - Summer (DST): UTC+2 (CEST)

Donja Pušća is a village in Croatia.
