= Radakovo =

Coordinates: 45°59′N 15°45′E

- Village
- Interactive map of Radakovo
- Country: Croatia
- County: Krapina-Zagorje County

Area
  - Total: 10.1 km^{2} (3.9 sq mi)

Population (2021)
  - Total: 455
  - Density: 45.0/km^{2} (117/sq mi)
- Time zone: UTC+1 (CET)
  - Summer (DST): UTC+2 (CEST)

Radakovo is a village in Croatia.
