= Pušća, Zagreb County =

Pušća
- Municipality
- Općina Pušća
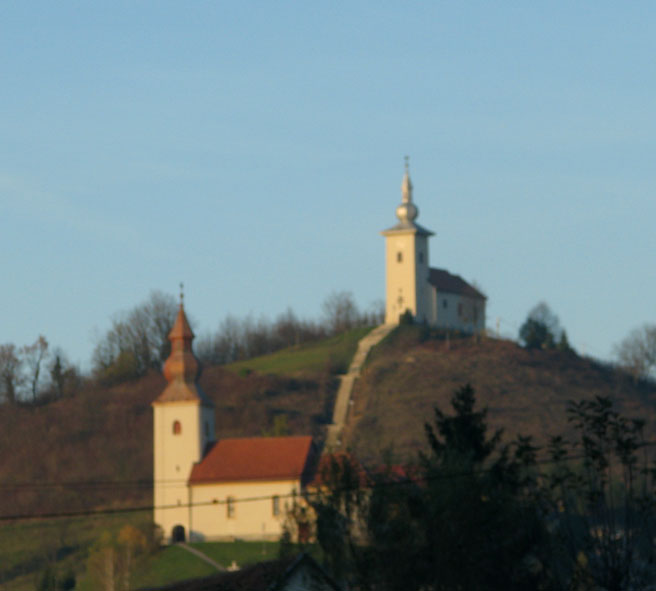

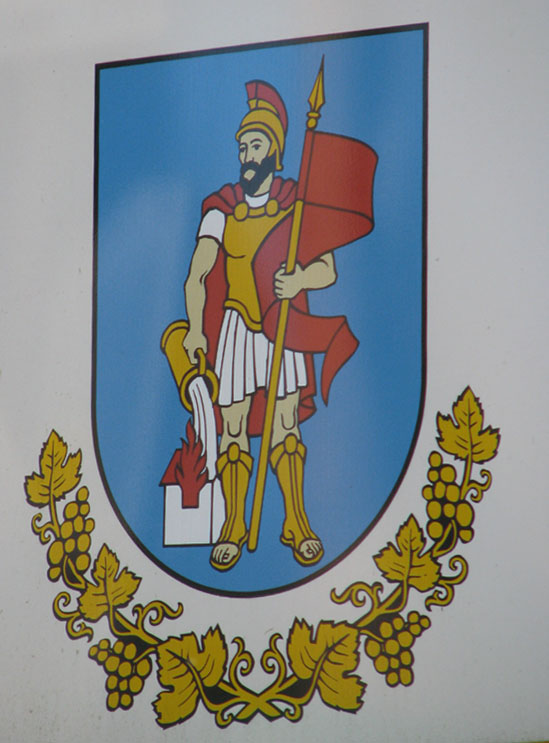
- Coat of arms

- Location of Pušća in Croatia
- Coordinates: 45°56′N 15°46′E
- Country: Croatia
- Region: Central Croatia
- County: Zagreb County
- Settlements: 8 settlements: Bregovljana; Donja Pušća; Dubrava Pušćanska; Gornja Pušća; Hrebine; Hruševec Pušćanski; Marija Magdalena; Žlebec Pušćanski

Government
  - Mayor: Filip Bernardić (HDZ)

Area
  - Total: 17.0 km^{2} (6.6 sq mi)

Population (2021)
  - Total: 2,564
  - Density: 151/km^{2} (391/sq mi)
- Time zone: UTC+1 (CET)
  - Summer (DST): UTC+2 (CEST)
- Postal code: 10294
- Area code: 01
- License plates: ZG
- Website: pusca.hr

Pušća is a municipality in Zagreb County in Croatia.

In the 2011 census, there were a total of 2,700 people living in the municipality, 97 percent of which were Croats. The municipality covers an area of 18.20 square kilometers (7.03 sq mi) and forms part of the Zaprešić metropolitan area.

The population was distributed in the following settlements:

- Bregovljana, population 122
- Donja Pušća, population 794
- Dubrava Pušćanska, population 186
- Gornja Pušća, population 605
- Hrebine, population 380
- Hruševec Pušćanski, population 241
- Marija Magdalena, population 263
- Žlebec Pušćanski, population 109
