= Prigorje Brdovečko =

Coordinates: 45°53′N 15°44′E

- Village
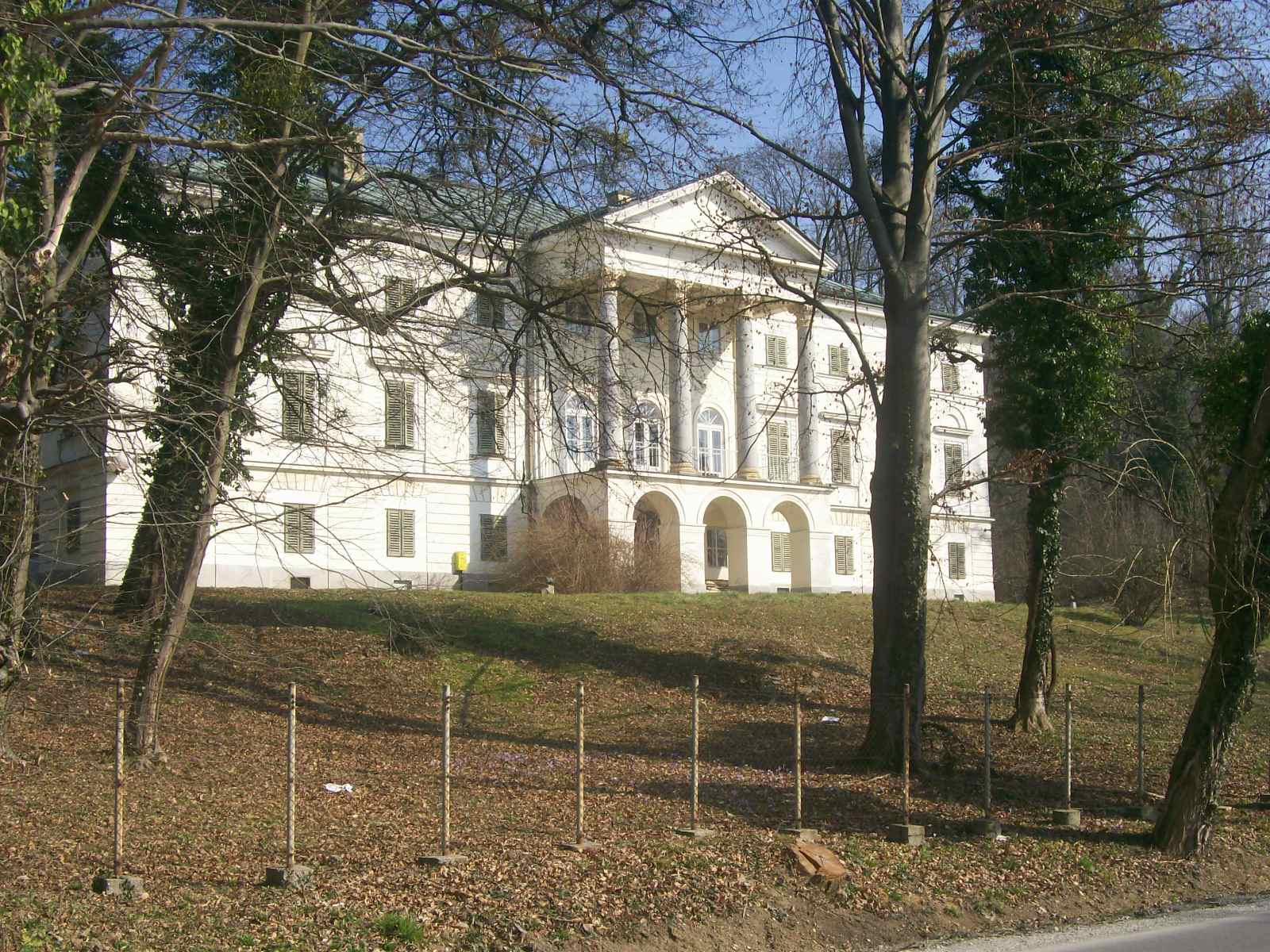
- Januševec Castle in Prigorje Brdovečko
- Interactive map of Prigorje Brdovečko
- Country: Croatia
- County: Zagreb County

Area
  - Total: 4.8 km^{2} (1.9 sq mi)

Population (2021)
  - Total: 1,340
  - Density: 280/km^{2} (720/sq mi)
- Time zone: UTC+1 (CET)
  - Summer (DST): UTC+2 (CEST)

Prigorje Brdovečko is a village in Croatia. It is connected by the D225 highway. It is home to baron Josip Vrkljan's Januševec manor.
