= Prudnice =

Coordinates: 45°52′16″N 15°43′55″E

- Village
- Interactive map of Prudnice
- Country: Croatia
- County: Zagreb County

Area
  - Total: 2.5 km^{2} (0.97 sq mi)

Population (2021)
  - Total: 655
  - Density: 260/km^{2} (680/sq mi)
- Time zone: UTC+1 (CET)
  - Summer (DST): UTC+2 (CEST)

Prudnice is a village in Croatia.
