= Ključ, Mionica =

Ključ Кључ
- Village (Selo)
- Location within Serbia
- Coordinates: 44.2264°N 20.0408°E
- Country: Serbia
- District: Kolubara District
- Municipality: Mionica
- Time zone: UTC+1 (CET)
  - Summer (DST): UTC+2 (CEST)

Ključ is a village situated in Mionica municipality in Serbia.

== History ==
The first mention of the village was recorded in the Turkish census (defter) for the Hijri year 934, that is, 1527/1528 according to the current calendar.

Transcribed into modern Turkish from Ottoman Arabic, the entry on page 240 of defter TD 144 read as follows:

Kluç karye, Valyeva nahiye - Village Ključ, Nahiyah Valjevo

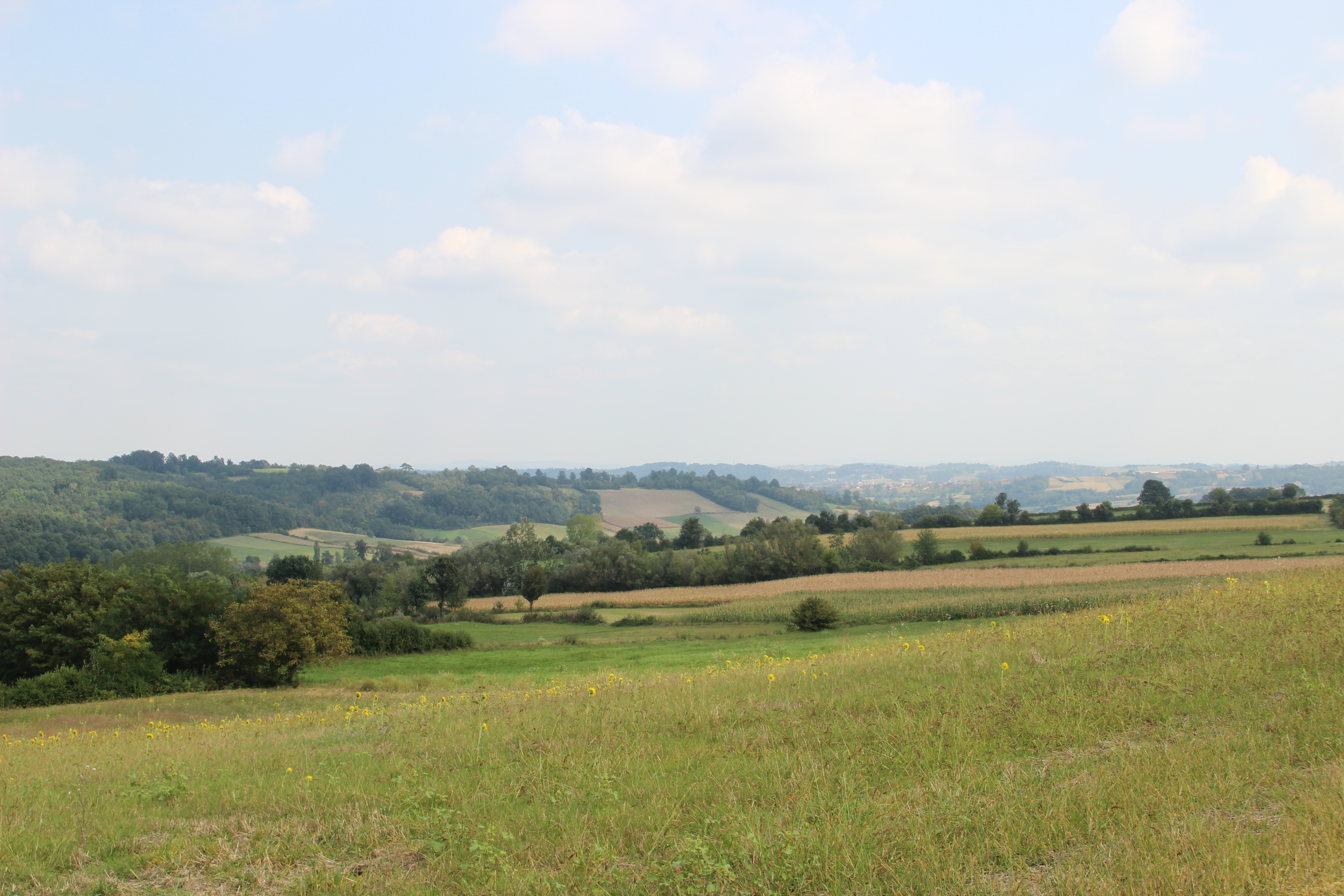
Ključ - panorama

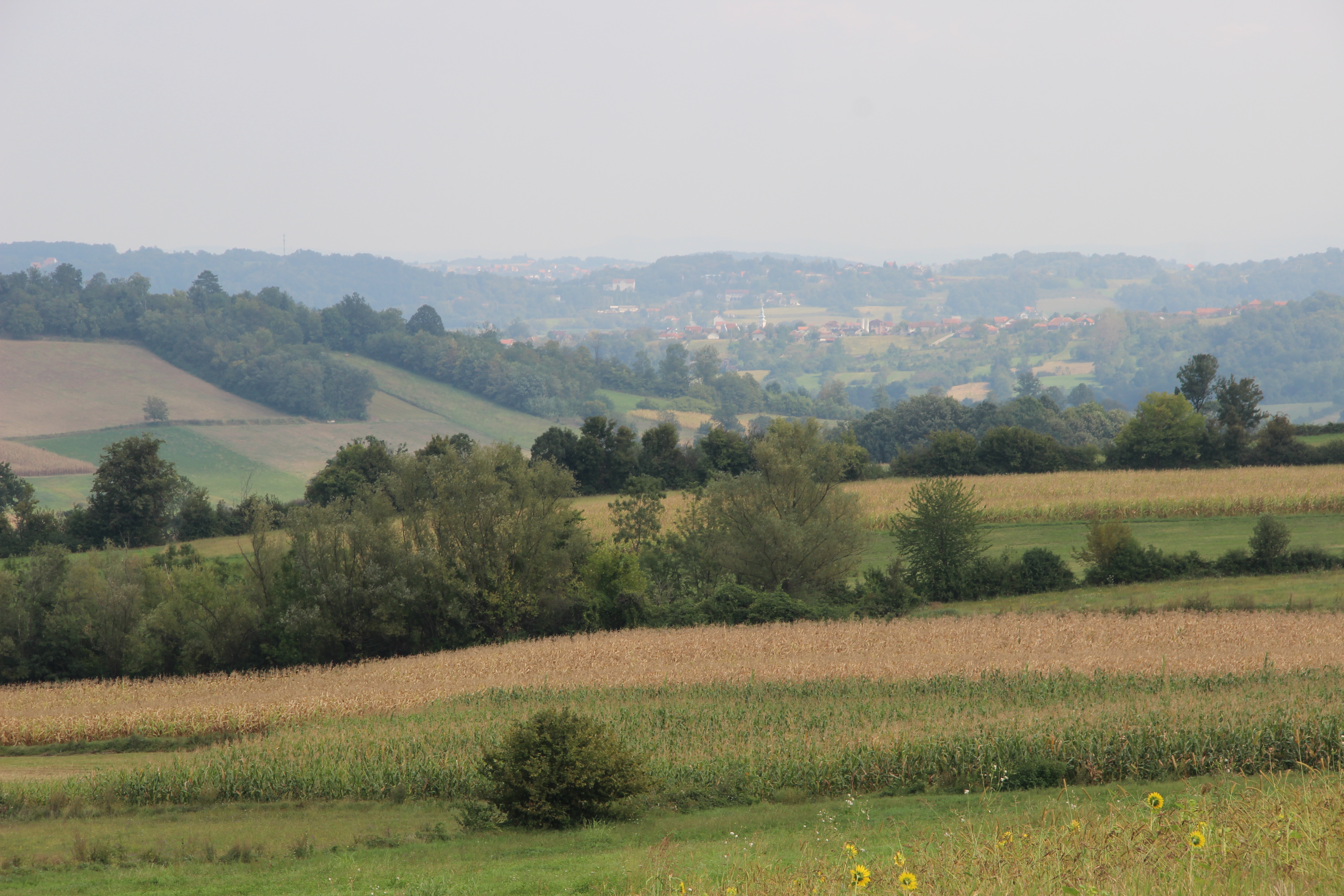
Ključ - panorama

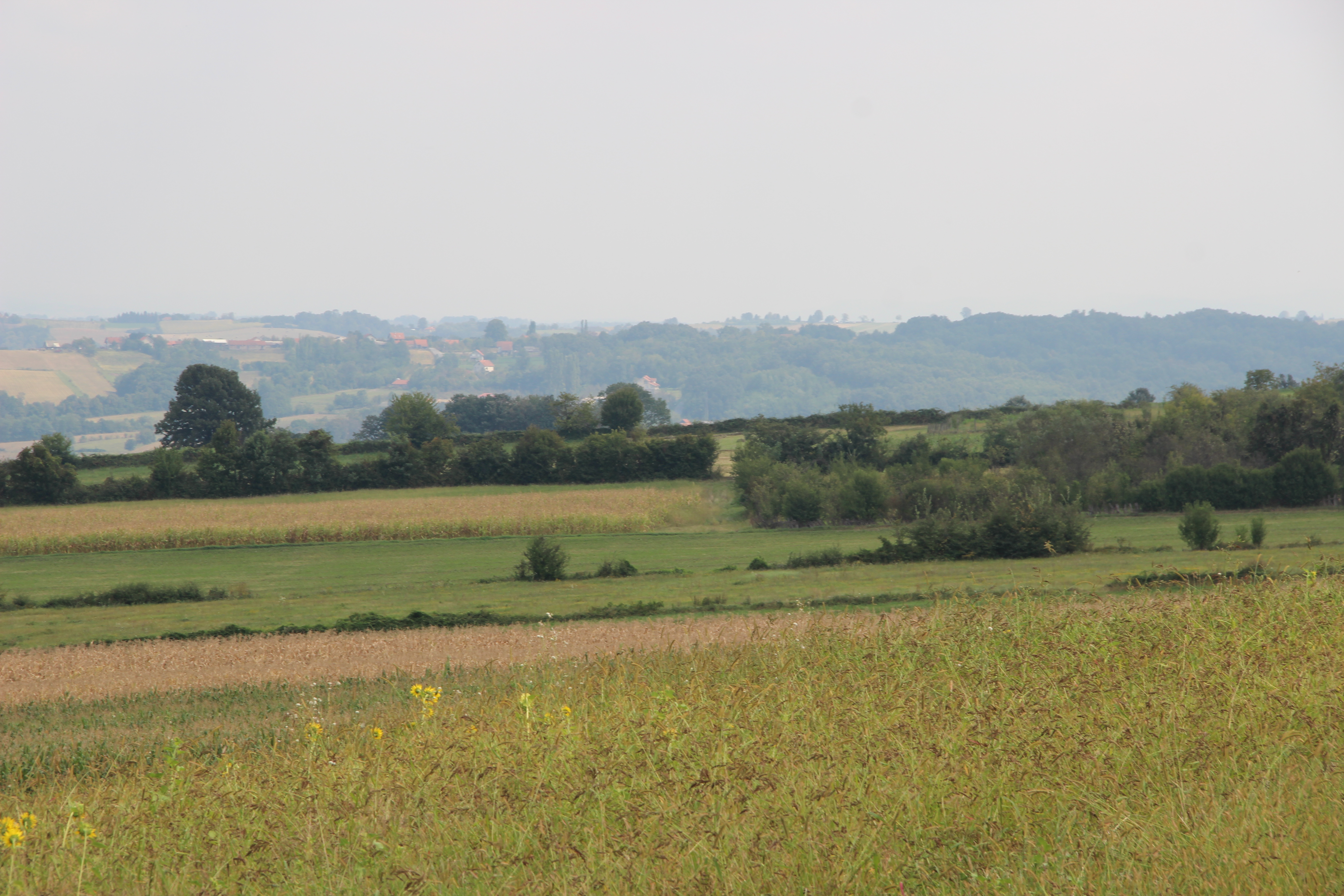
Ključ - panorama

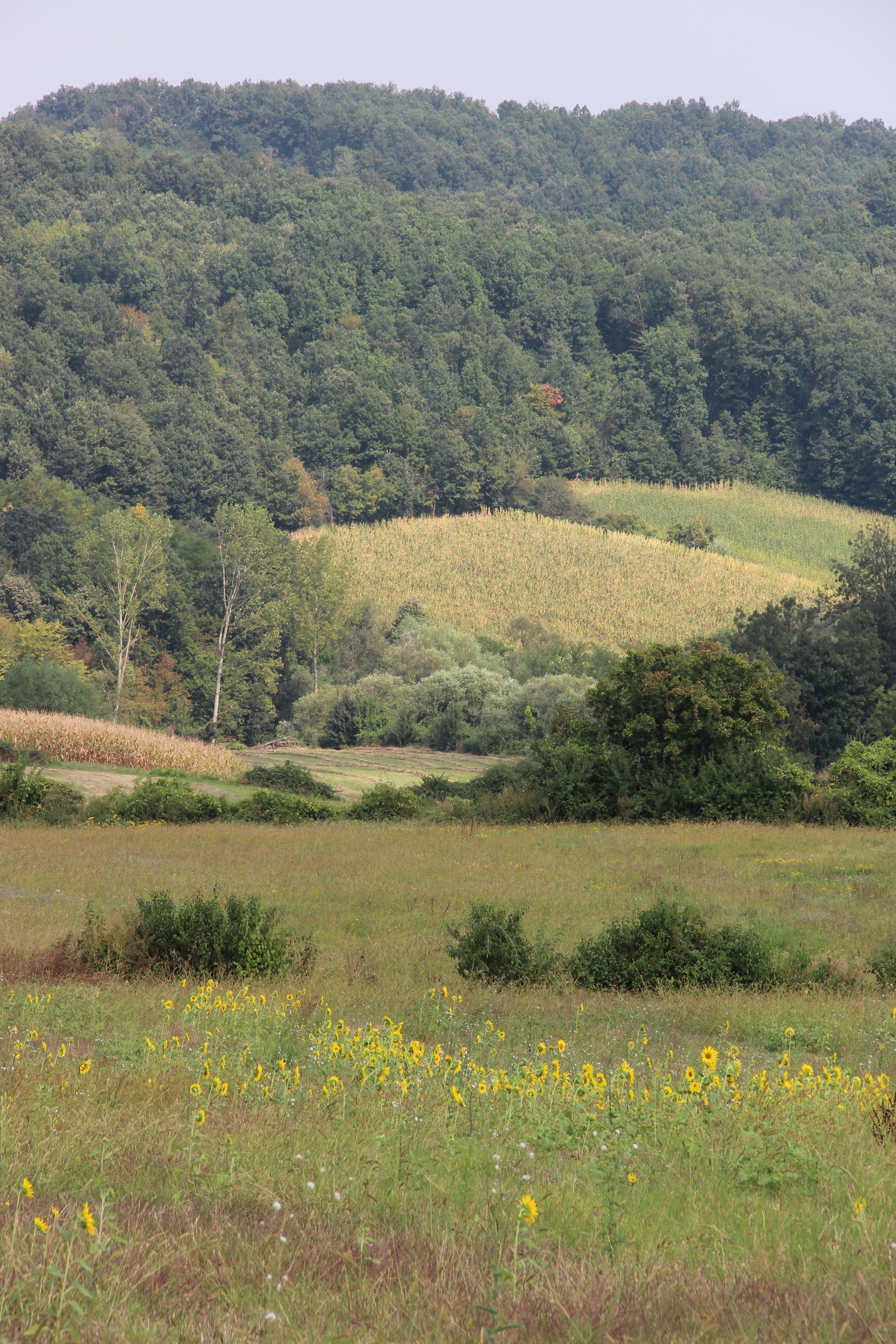
Ključ - panorama

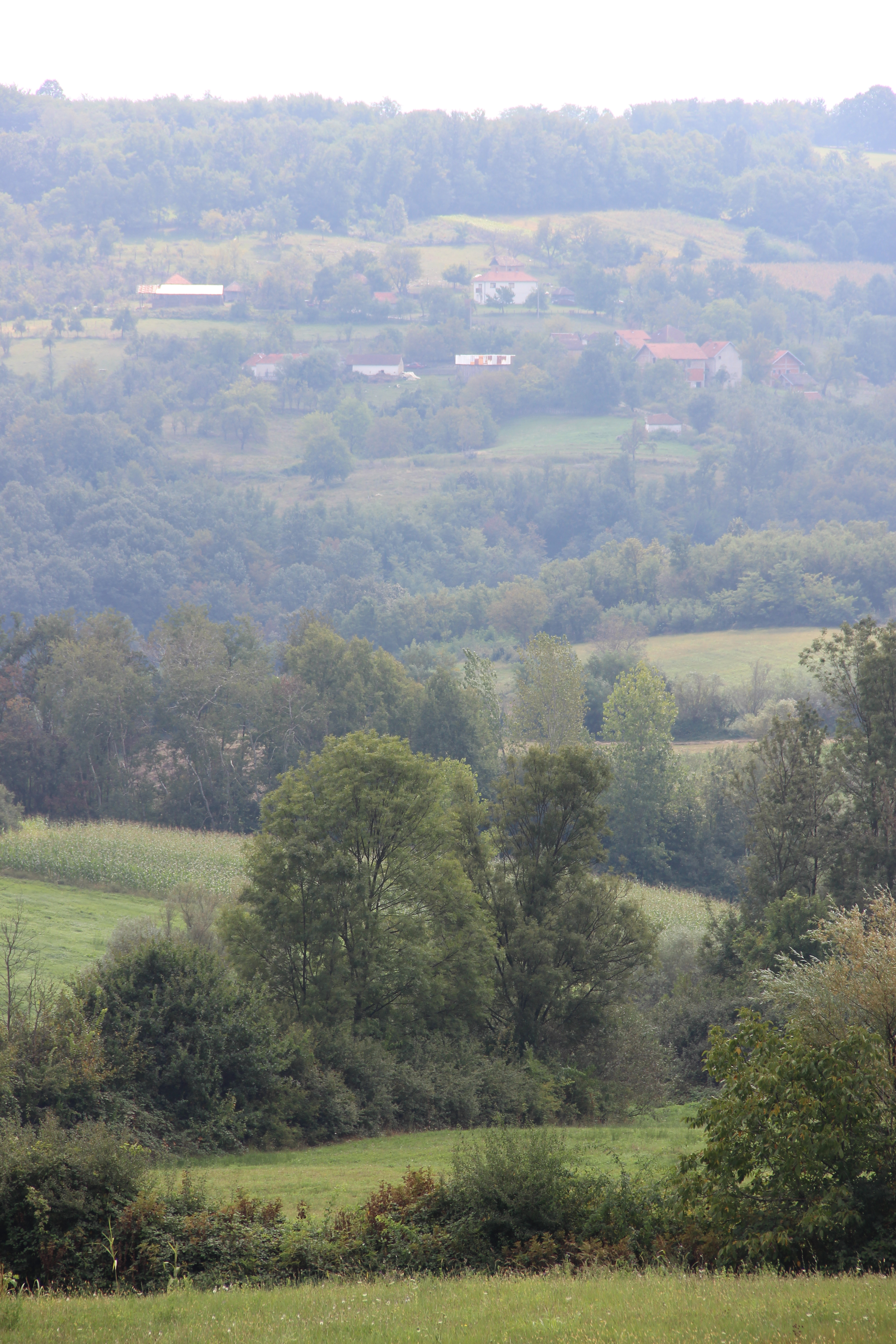
Ključ - panorama

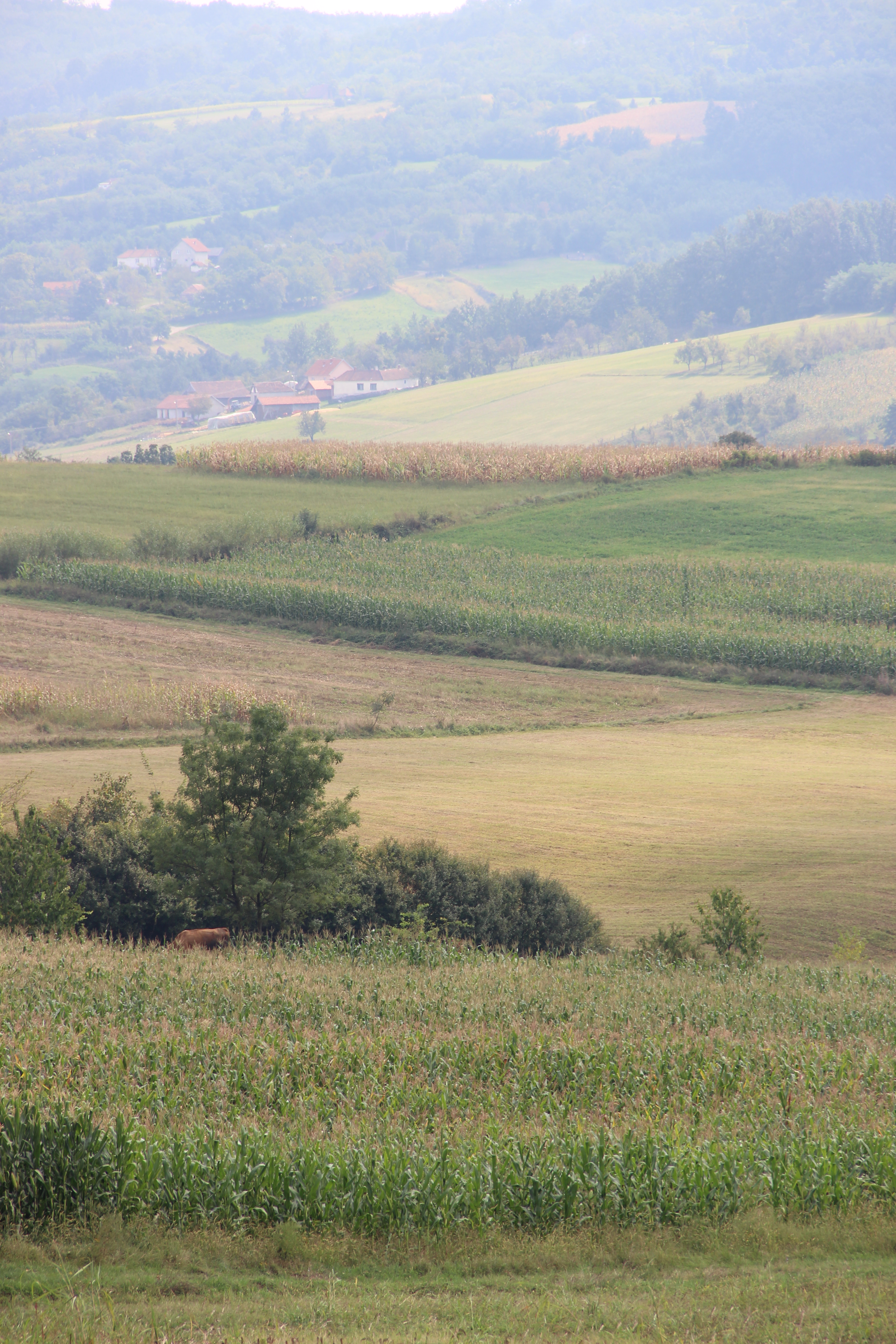
Ključ - panorama
