= Strmec Stubički =

Coordinates: 45°58′N 15°55′E

- Village
- Interactive map of Strmec Stubički
- Country: Croatia

Area
  - Total: 2.1 sq mi (5.4 km^{2})

Population (2021)
  - Total: 799
  - Density: 380/sq mi (150/km^{2})
- Time zone: UTC+1 (CET)
  - Summer (DST): UTC+2 (CEST)

Strmec Stubički is a village in Croatia.
