= Kraljevec na Sutli =

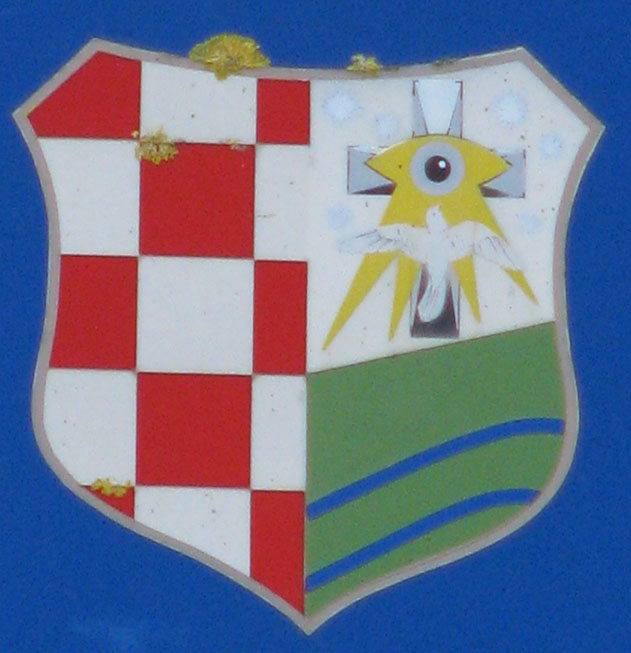
- Seal
- Interactive map of Kraljevec na Sutli
- Location within Croatia
- Coordinates: 45°58′48″N 15°43′48″E
- Country: Croatia
- County: Krapina-Zagorje County

Government
  - Mayor: Blanka Stipčić Berić (SDP)

Area
  - Total: 26.8 km^{2} (10.3 sq mi)

Population (2021)
  - Total: 1,591
  - Density: 59.4/km^{2} (154/sq mi)
- Time zone: UTC+1 (CET)
  - Summer (DST): UTC+2 (CEST)
- Website: kraljevecnasutli.hr

Kraljevec na Sutli is a village and municipality in the Krapina-Zagorje County, northern Croatia.

== History ==
In ancient times, a road passed through the Sutla river valley, which was important until the Middle Ages. The oldest toponyms from the municipality are Grača and Radakovo.

The settlement was first mentioned in 1463 in a document of King Matthias Corvinus, in which the King confirmed ownership of Cesargrad, along with Rizvic, Kumrovec, Tuhelj, Kraljevac and the market town of Klanjec, to the Styrian nobleman Andrija Baumkircher. From 1521, it belonged to the Counts Erdody, who ruled it and the surrounding areas, along with the Novi Dvori castle, until 1914, when they sold the estates to the Bruckner family. The Erdodys had a great influence on the development of the Radakovo settlement when, after the fall of the Croatian Kingdom in Bosnia and the fall of the two strongest fortresses, Bobovac and Kraljeva Sutjeska, they allowed the fleeing people to settle in the area. The parish of Kraljevec began its activities in 1782 in Kapelski Vrh, in the chapel of St. Joseph, and in 1836 the church of the Holy Trinity was built.

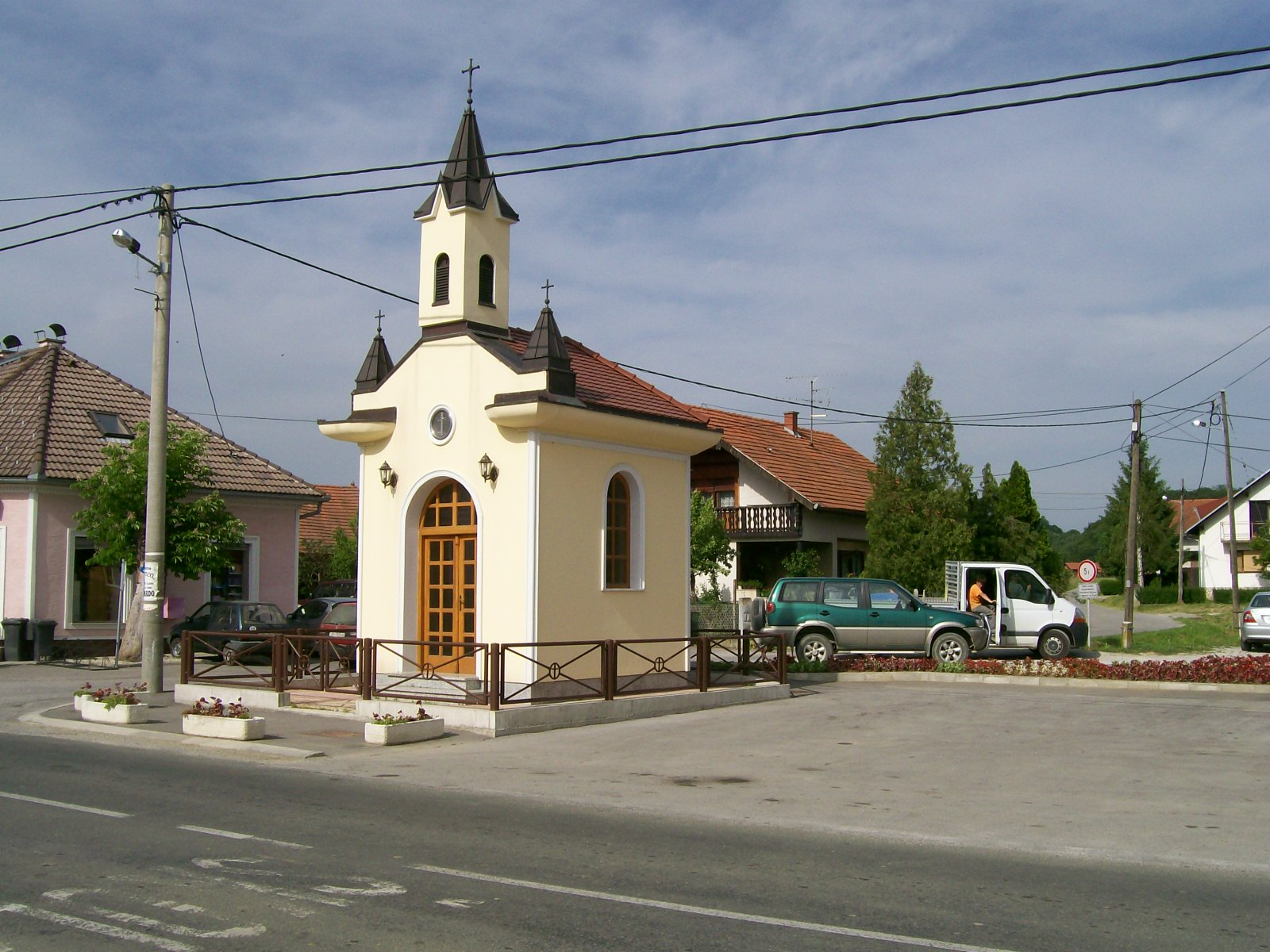
Chapel in Kraljevec na Sutli

== Demographics ==
In the 2021 census, there were a total of 1,591 inhabitants in the area, in the following settlements:

- Draše, population 145
- Gornji Čemehovec, population 101
- Kačkovec, population 148
- Kapelski Vrh, population 100
- Kraljevec na Sutli, population 318
- Lukavec Klanječki, population 65
- Movrač, population 122
- Pušava, population 28
- Radakovo, population 455
- Strmec Sutlanski, population 109

In the same census, an absolute majority of the population were Croats at 99.18%.

Kraljevec na Sutli: Population trends 1857–2021
v

population	2463	2598	2706	3066	3248	3453	3163	3141	3140	3052	2775	2526	2191	1973	1815	1727	1591
	1857	1869	1880	1890	1900	1910	1921	1931	1948	1953	1961	1971	1981	1991	2001	2011	2021

Sources: Croatian Bureau of Statistics publications

== Administration ==
The current mayor of Kraljevec na Sutli is Blanka Stipčić Berić (SDP) and the Kraljevec na Sutli Municipal Council consists of 9 seats.

Groups	Councilors per group
SDP	6 / 9
HDZ	2 / 9
Independent	1 / 9
