= Rozga =

Rozga is a surname. Notable people with the surname include:

- David Rozga (died 2010), American teenager
- Jelena Rozga (born 1977), Croatian singer
