= Šenkovec, Zagreb County =

Šenkovec
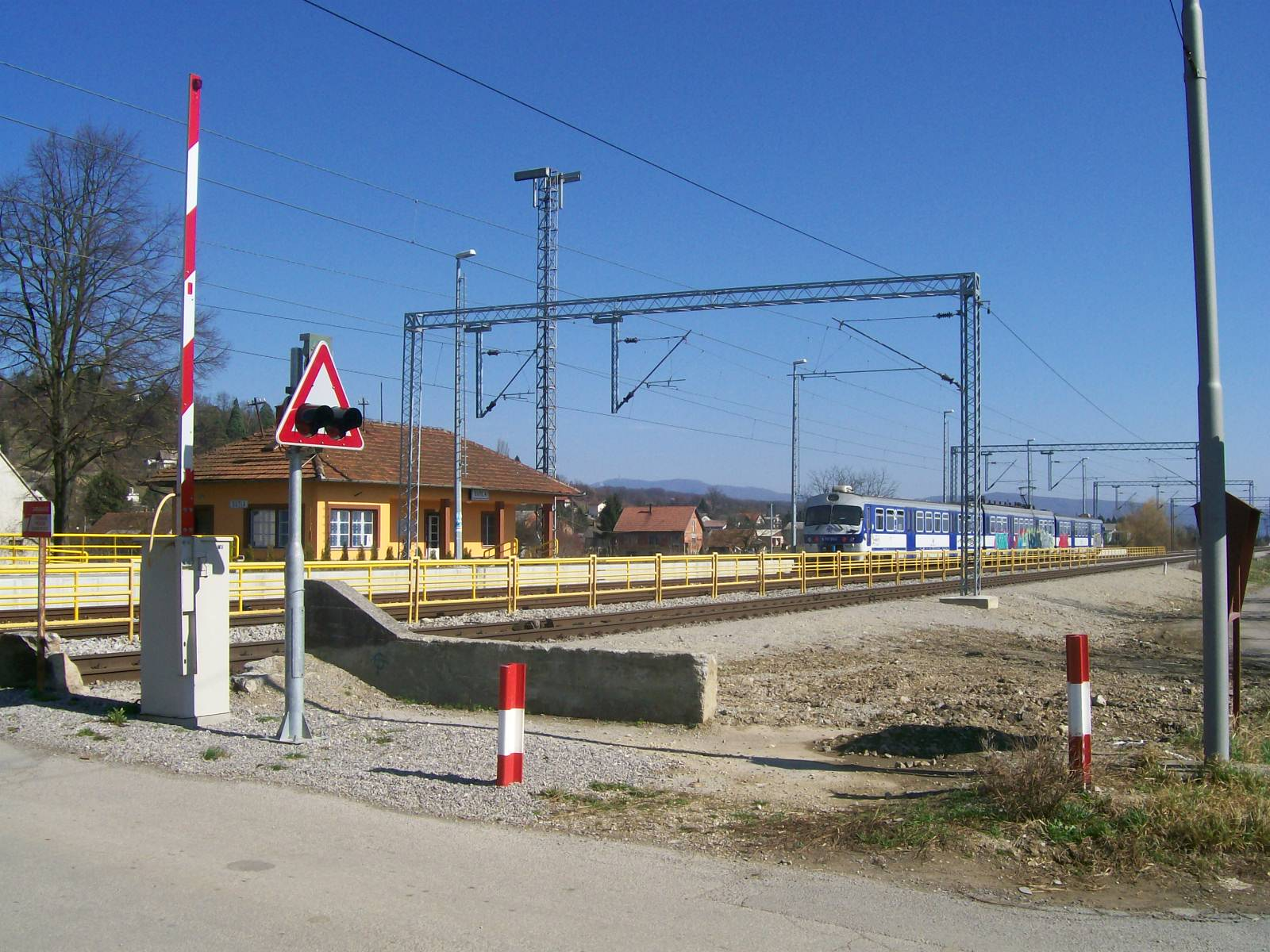
- Railway station in Šenkovec

- Location within Croatia
- Coordinates: 45°53′18″N 15°41′42″E
- Country: Croatia
- County: Zagreb County
- Municipality: Brdovec

Area
  - Total: 0.9 km^{2} (0.35 sq mi)

Population (2021)
  - Total: 664
  - Density: 740/km^{2} (1,900/sq mi)
- Time zone: UTC+1 (CET)
  - Summer (DST): UTC+2 (CEST)

Šenkovec is a naselje (settlement) in the municipality of Brdovec, Zagreb County, Croatia. According to the 2001 census, it has 733 inhabitants living in an area of 0.90 square kilometers (0.35 sq mi).
