= Zagreb County =

County in central Croatia

Coordinates: 45.749°N 15.571°E

Zagreb County Zagrebačka županija (Croatian)
- County
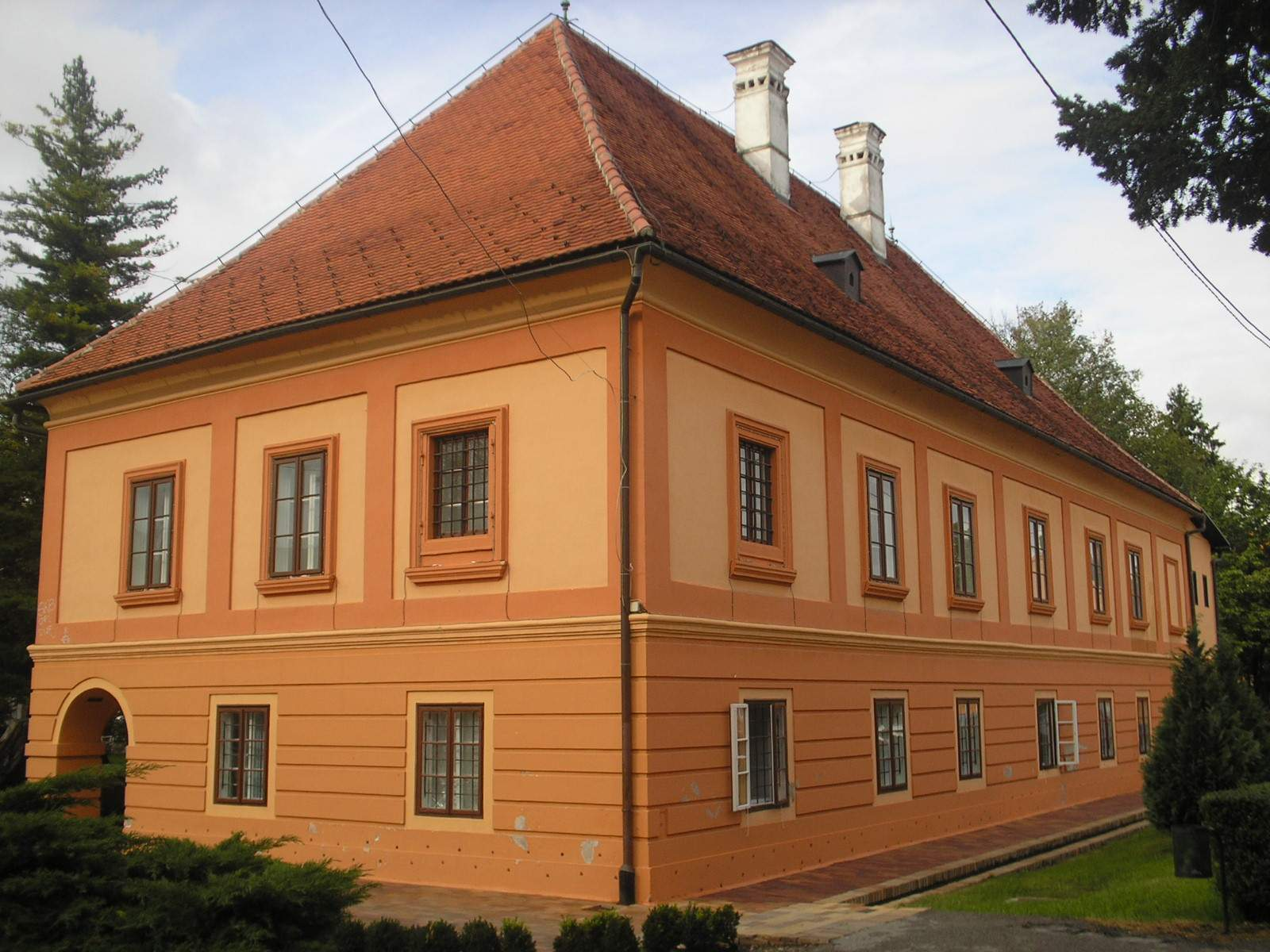
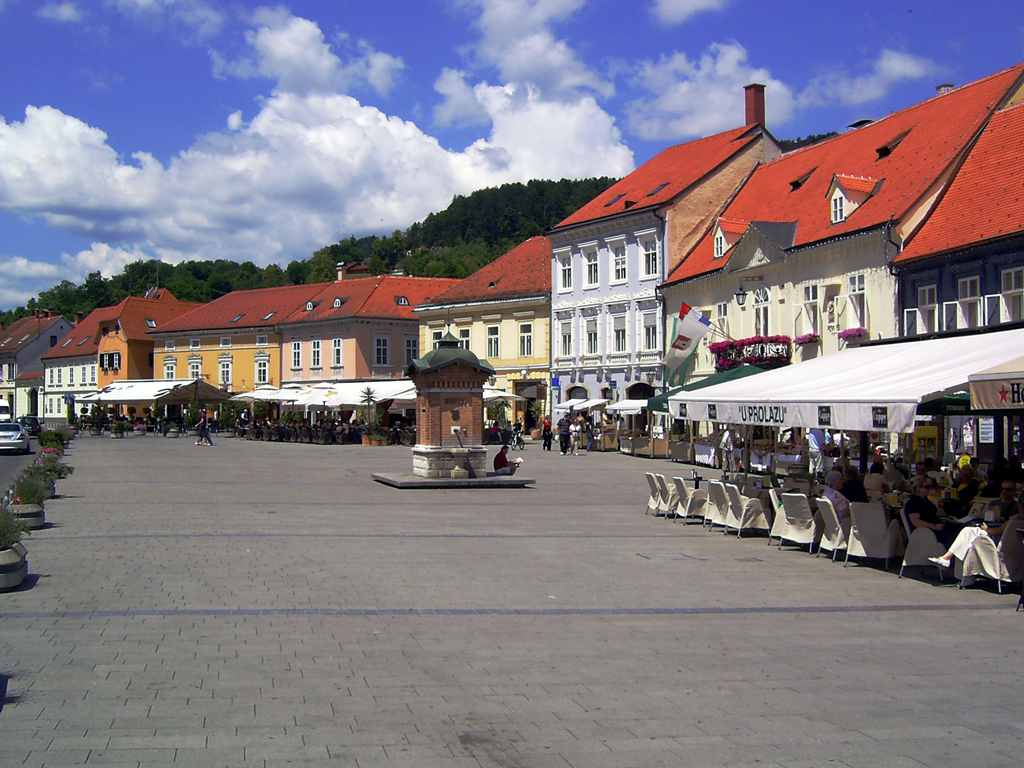
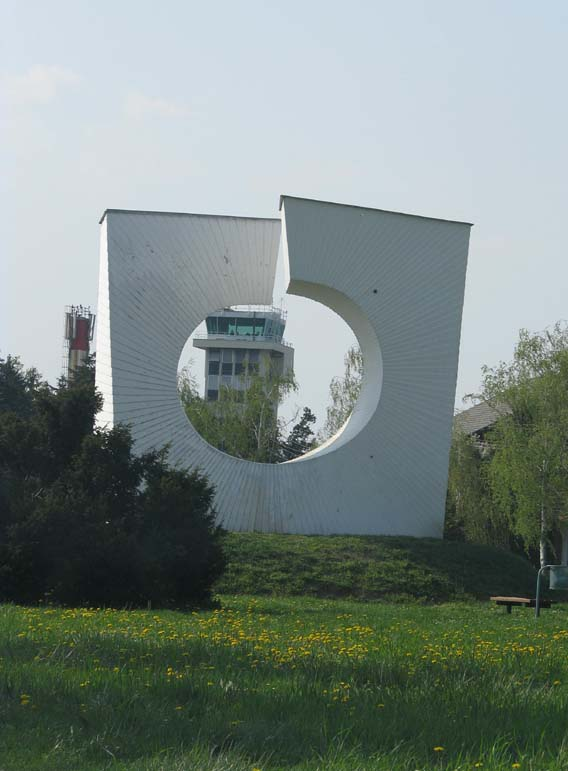
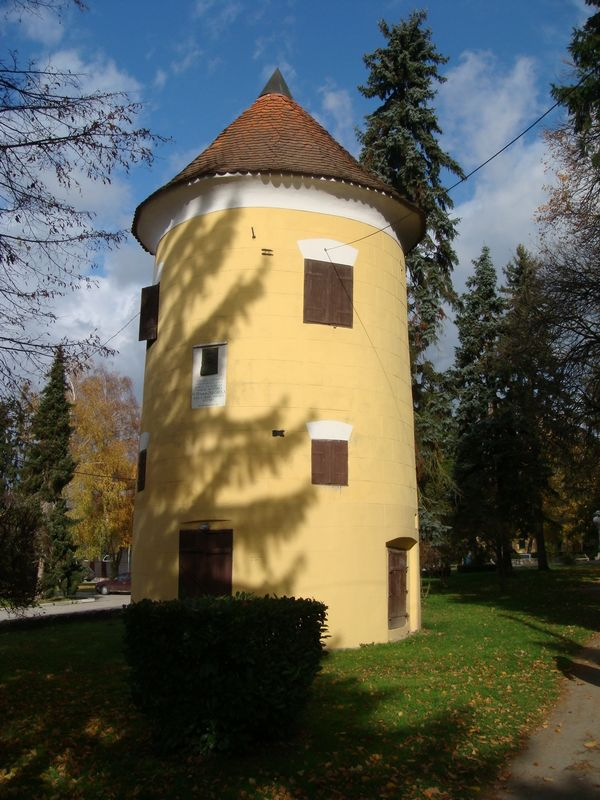
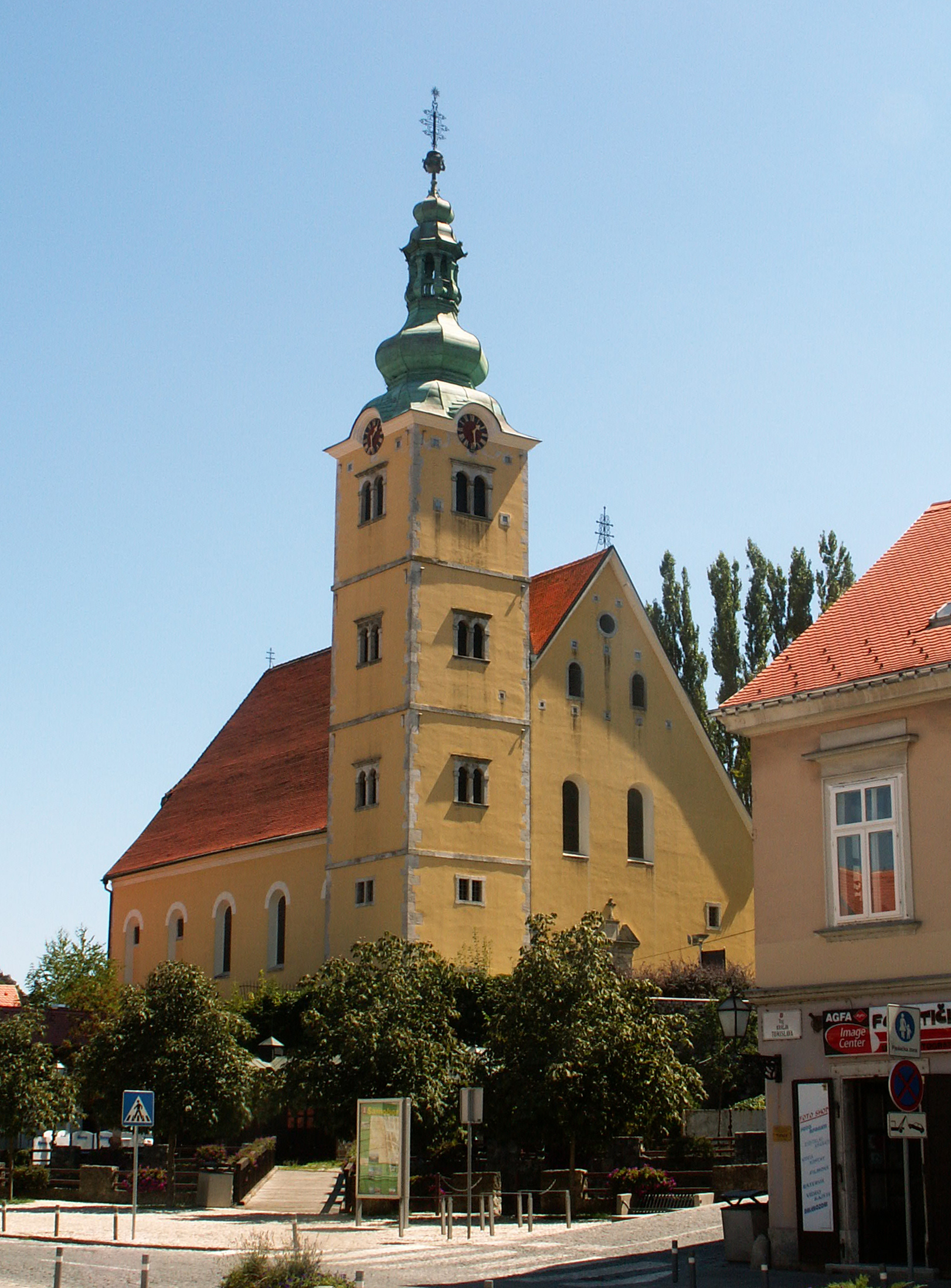
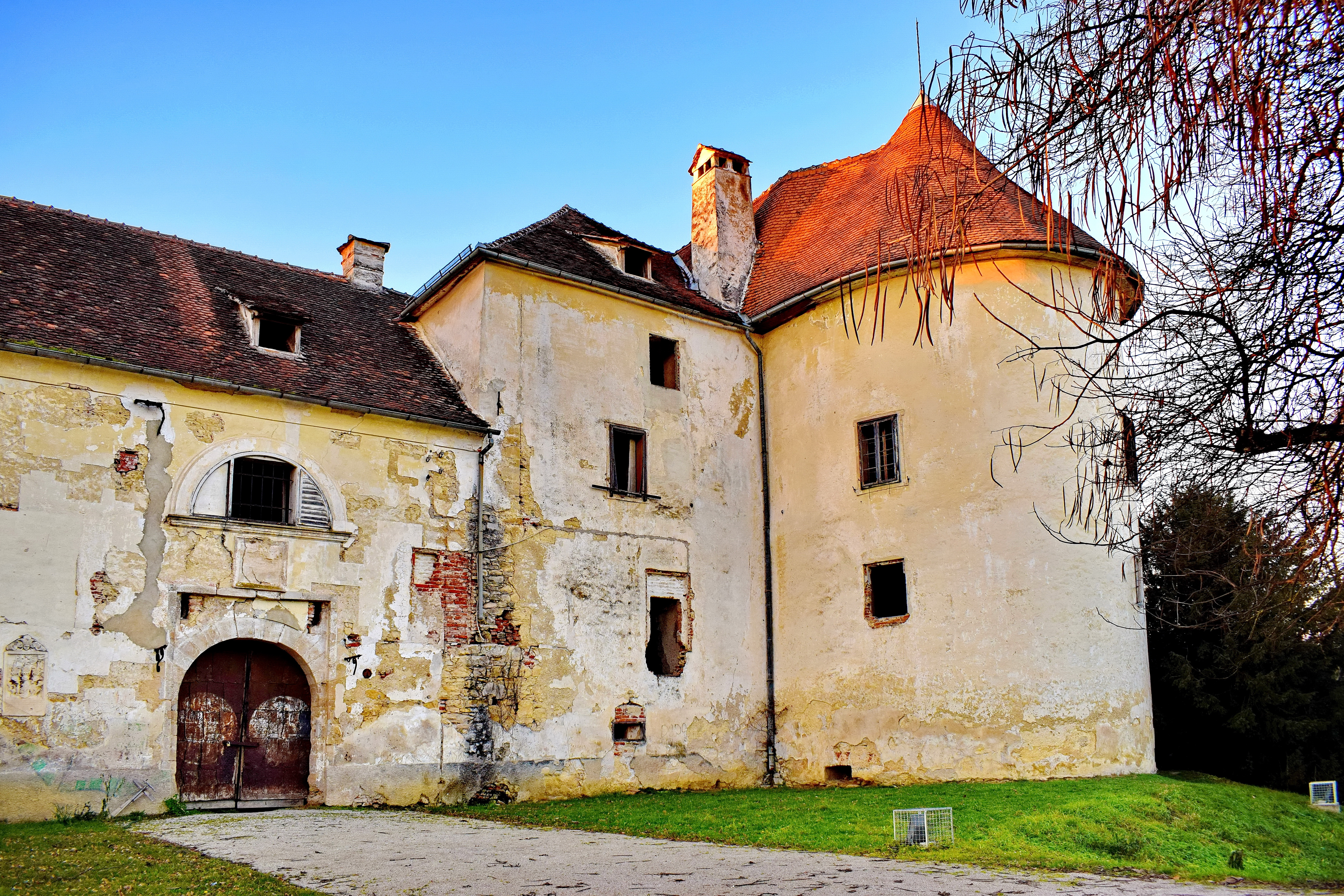
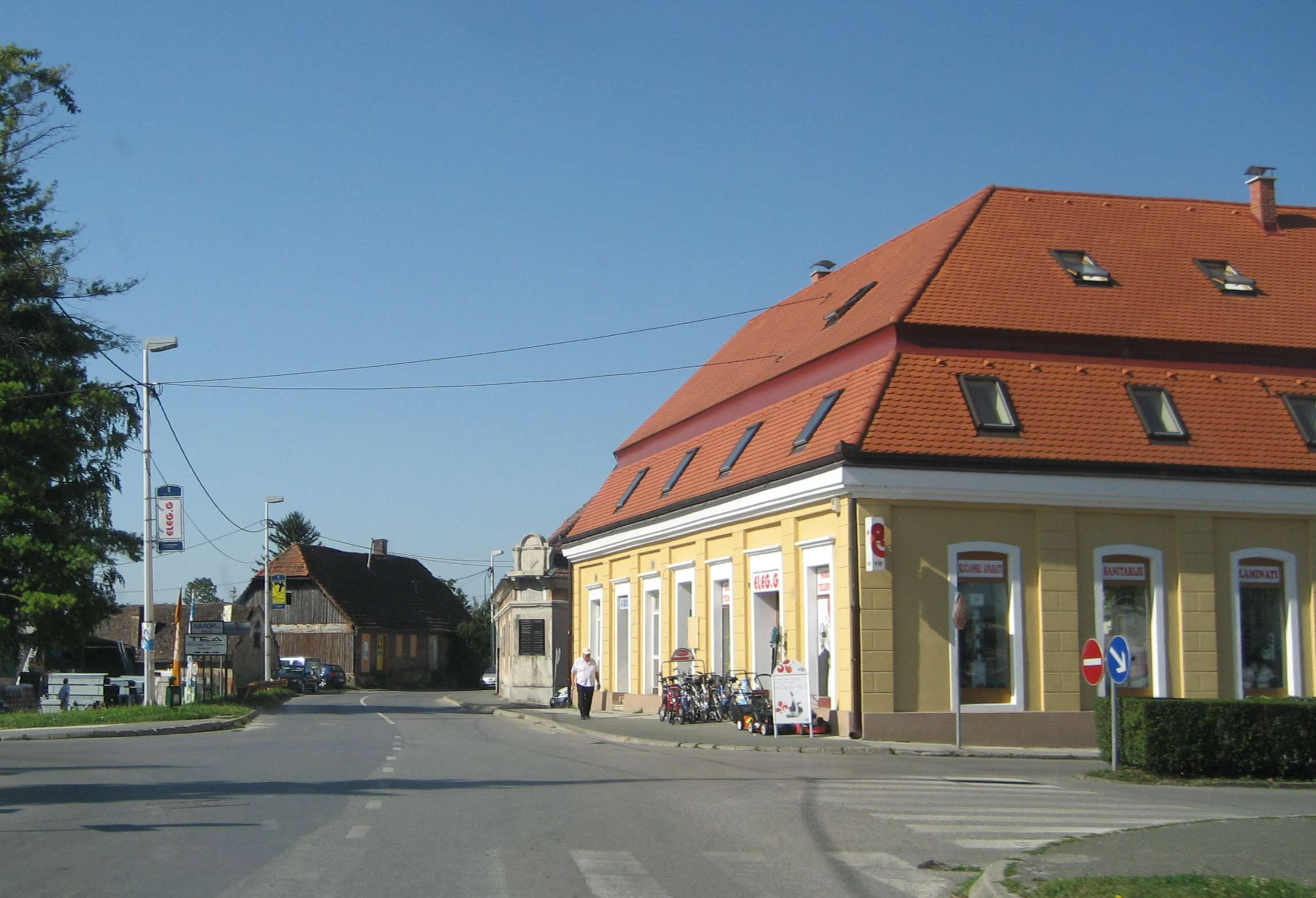
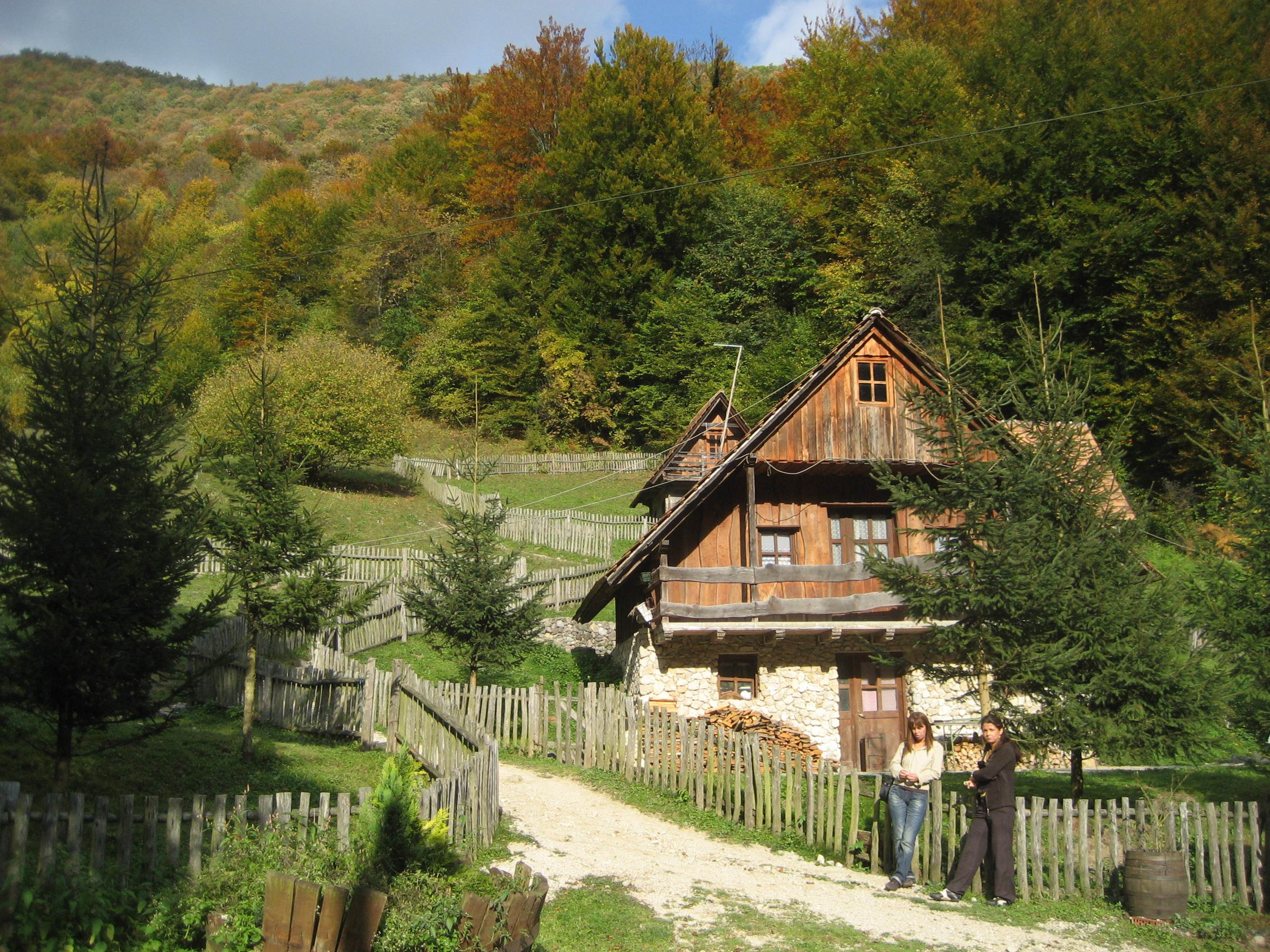
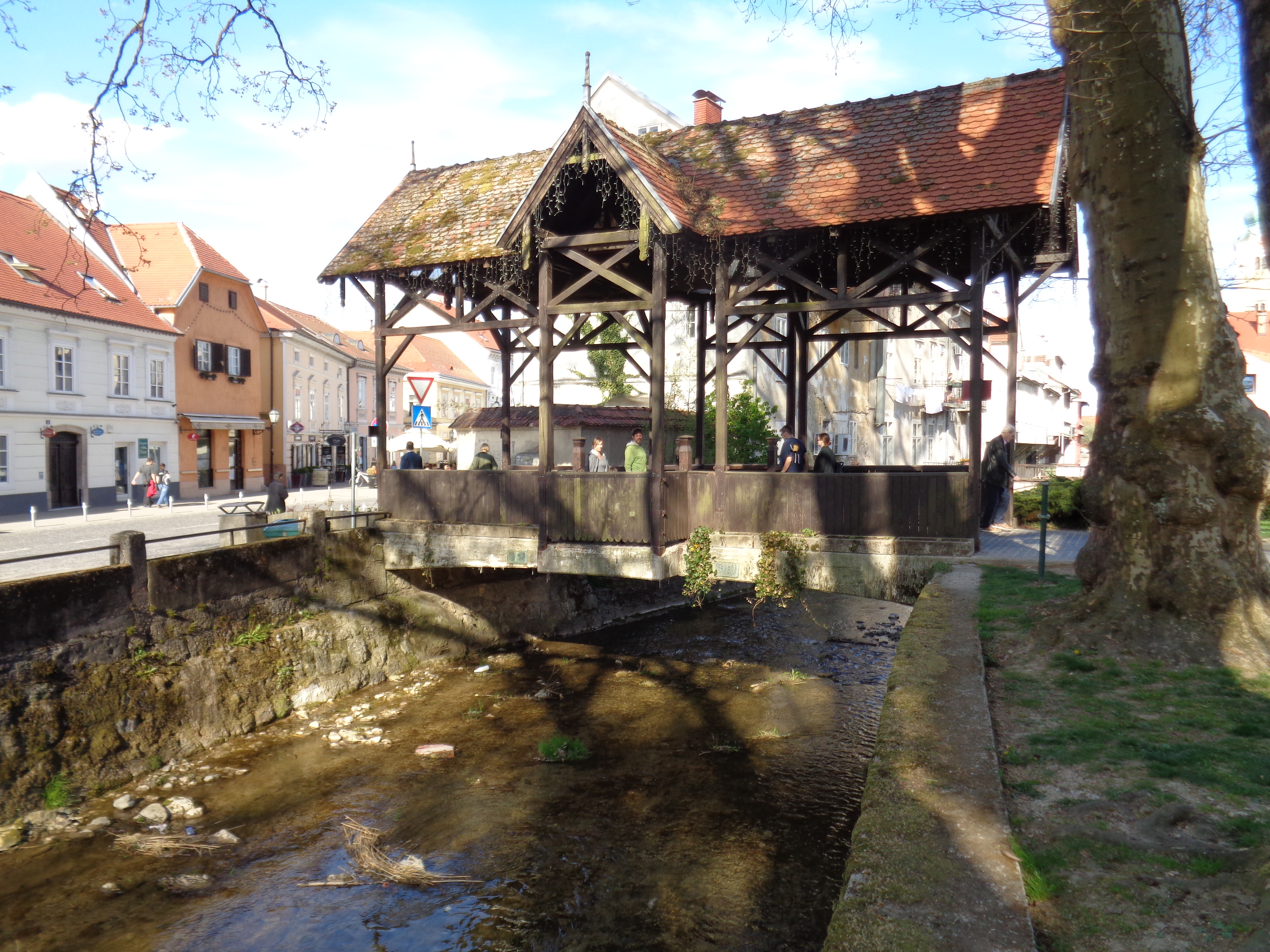
- From top, left to right: Turopolje Museum in Velika Gorica; Main square of Samobor; Monument to the fallen defenders; Petr Žrinski Tower in Vrbovec; Church of Saint Anastasia; Erdödy Castle in Jastrebarsko; Main street of Ivanic Grad; Ecovillage Žumberak; Old bridge over Granica River in Samobor

- Flag Coat of arms

- Zagreb County within Croatia
- Country: Croatia
- County seat: Zagreb

Government
  - Župan (Prefect): Stjepan Kožić (SKNL)
  - Assembly: 47 members: • SDP, HSS, HNS (14); • HDZ, HSU (12); • Independents (7); • Independent List of Stjepan Kožić (6); • BM 365 (2); • Focus (2); • MOST (2); • DOMiNO (1); • DP (1)

Area
  - Total: 3,060 km^{2} (1,180 sq mi)

Population (2021)
  - Total: 299,983
  - Density: 98.0/km^{2} (254/sq mi)
- Area code: 01
- ISO 3166 code: HR-01
- HDI (2022): 0.860 very high · 7th
- Website: www.zagrebacka-zupanija.hr

Zagreb County (Croatian: Zagrebačka županija) is a county in Northern Croatia. It surrounds, but does not contain, the nation's capital Zagreb, which is a separate territorial unit. For that reason, the county is often nicknamed "Zagreb ring" (Croatian: zagrebački prsten). According to the 2021 census, the county has 299,985 inhabitants, most of whom live in smaller urban satellite towns.

The Zagreb County once included the city of Zagreb, but in 1997 they separated, when the City was given a special status. Although separated from the city of Zagreb both administratively and territorially, it remains closely linked with it.

Zagreb County borders on Krapina-Zagorje County, the city of Zagreb, Varaždin County, and Koprivnica-Križevci County in the north, Bjelovar-Bilogora County in the east, Sisak-Moslavina County in the south and Karlovac County in the southwest as well as Slovenia in the west.

Franjo Tuđman Airport is located on the territory of Zagreb County, the biggest and most important airport in the country.

== Administrative divisions ==
Zagreb County is divided into 9 towns and 25 municipalities.

Towns
Name	Population	Area
Dugo Selo	17,466	52.22 km^{2}
Ivanić-Grad	14,548	173.57 km^{2}
Jastrebarsko	15,866	226.50 km^{2}
Samobor	37,633	250.73 km^{2}
Sveta Nedelja	18,059	41.43 km^{2}
Sveti Ivan Zelina	15,959	184.68 km^{2}
Velika Gorica	63,517	328.65 km^{2}
Vrbovec	14,797	159.05 km^{2}
Zaprešić	25,223	52.60 km^{2}

Municipalities
Name	Population	Area
Bedenica	1,432	21.70 km^{2}
Bistra	6,632	52.74 km^{2}
Brckovljani	6,837	71.14 km^{2}
Brdovec	11,134	37.27 km^{2}
Dubrava	5,245	115.18 km^{2}
Dubravica	1,437	20.46 km^{2}
Farkaševac	1,937	73.66 km^{2}
Gradec	3,681	88.85 km^{2}
Jakovlje	3,930	35.71 km^{2}
Klinča Sela	5,231	77.64 km^{2}
Kloštar Ivanić	6,091	77.59 km^{2}
Krašić	2,640	69.40 km^{2}
Kravarsko	1,987	58.03 km^{2}
Križ	6,963	118.46 km^{2}
Luka	1,351	17.17 km^{2}
Marija Gorica	2,233	17.10 km^{2}
Orle	1,975	57.61 km^{2}
Pisarovina	3,689	145.00 km^{2}
Pokupsko	2,224	105.73 km^{2}
Preseka	1,448	47.86 km^{2}
Pušća	2,700	18.20 km^{2}
Rakovec	1,252	35.11 km^{2}
Rugvica	7,871	93.73 km^{2}
Stupnik	3,735	23.20 km^{2}
Žumberak	883	110.17 km^{2}

== County government ==
Current Župan: Stjepan Kožić (SKNL)

The county assembly is composed of 45 representatives, organized as follows:

- Croatian Democratic Union (HDZ)/Croatian Peasants Party (HSS)/ HSU - 21
- Social Democratic Party of Croatia (SDP)/Croatian People's Party – Liberal Democrats (HNS)/ Democratic Centre (DC) / HSLS - 19
- SU - 3
- HSP - 2

== Demographics ==
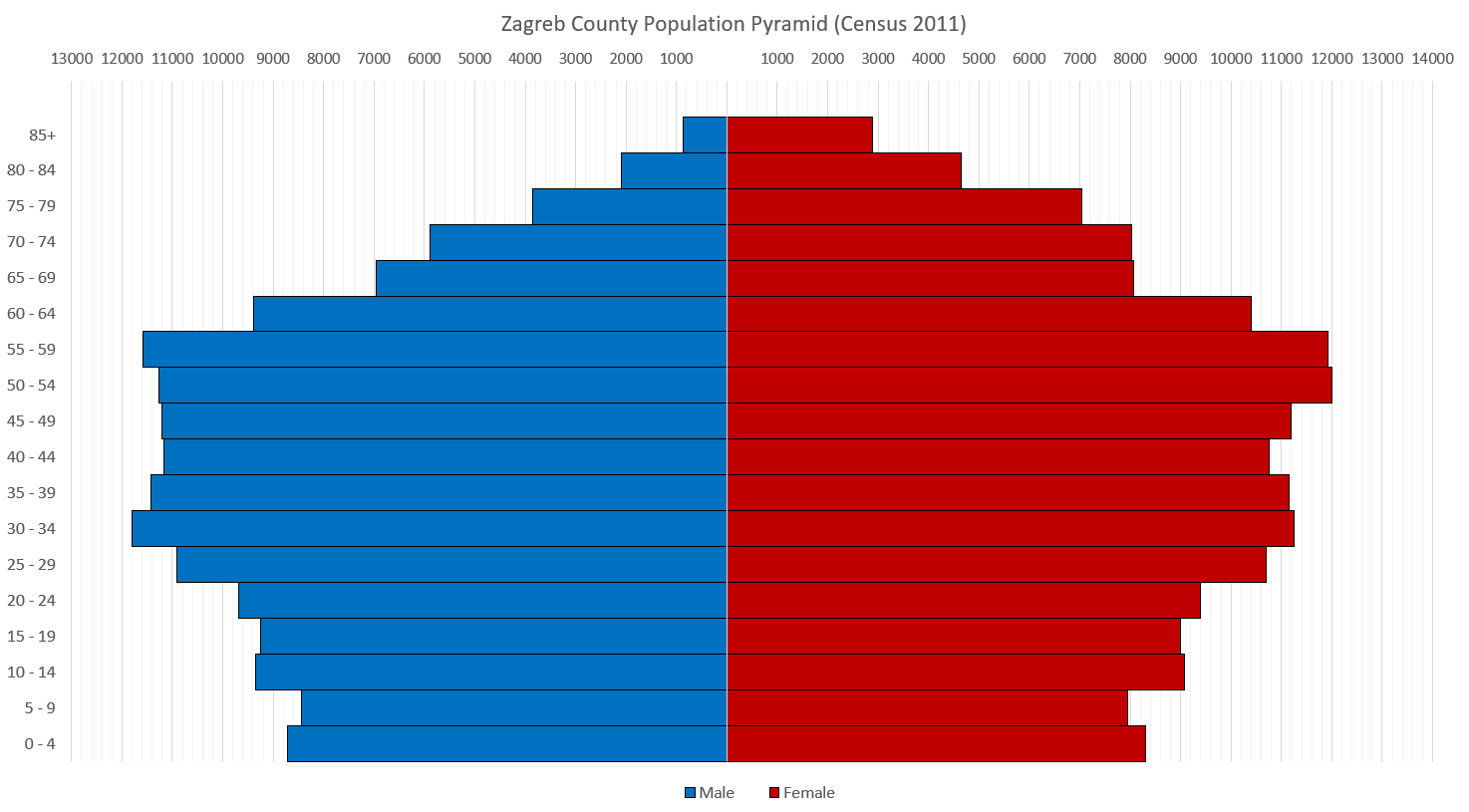
Population pyramid of Zagreb County per 2011 Census.

Zagreb County: Population trends 1857–2021
v

population	134754	146592	155324	178938	194643	211150	208141	224095	227538	233411	233875	232836	259429	282989	309696	317606	301206
	1857	1869	1880	1890	1900	1910	1921	1931	1948	1953	1961	1971	1981	1991	2001	2011	2021

Sources: Croatian Bureau of Statistics publications

== See also ==
- Zagreb County (former)
- Category:Former counties of Croatia
