= Blanca, Sevnica =

Blanca
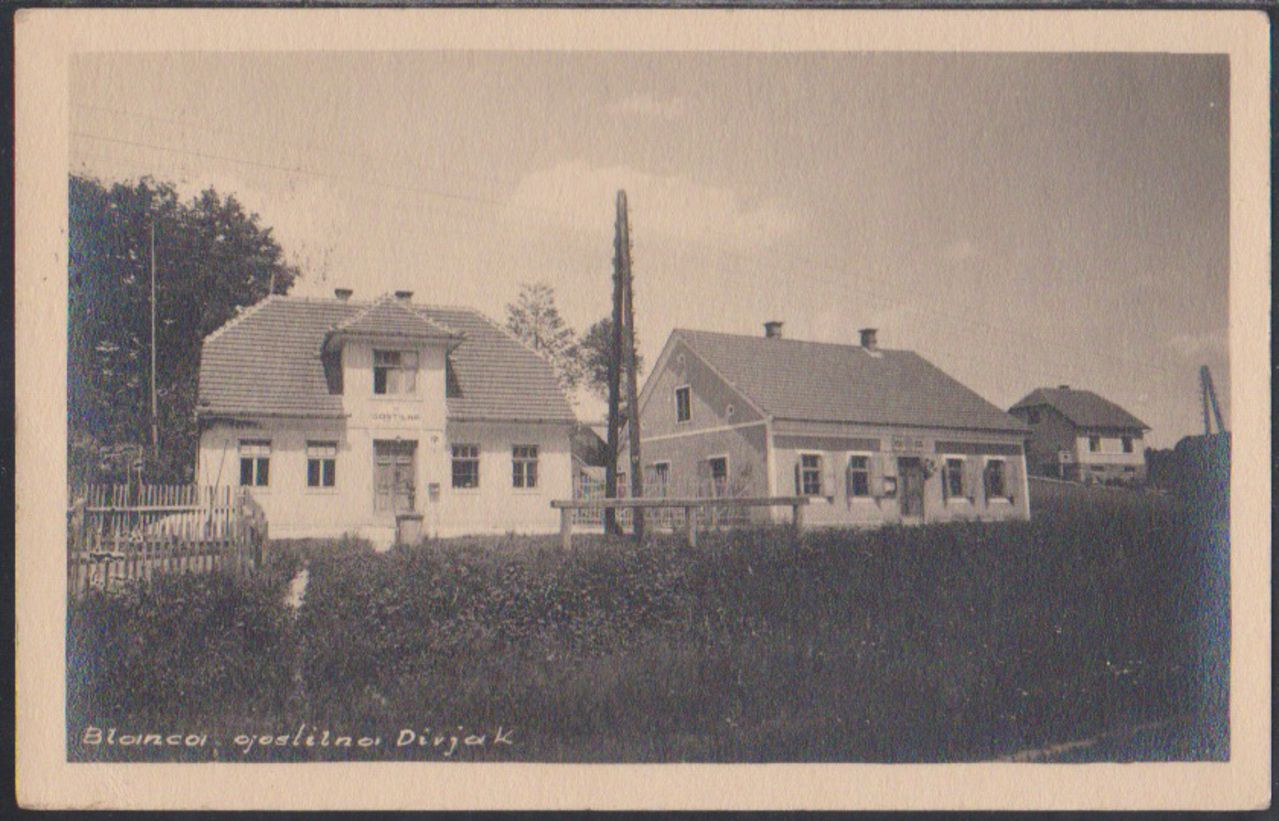
- Blanca in 1938

- Location in Slovenia
- Coordinates: 45°59′33.61″N 15°23′21.78″E
- Country: Slovenia
- Traditional region: Styria
- Statistical region: Lower Sava
- Municipality: Sevnica

Area
  - Total: 2.42 km^{2} (0.93 sq mi)
- Elevation: 172.2 m (565 ft)

Population (2002)
  - Total: 279

Blanca (pronounced [ˈblaːntsa]) is a settlement on the left bank of the Sava River in the Municipality of Sevnica in central Slovenia.The area is part of the historical region of Styria. The municipality is now included in the Lower Sava Statistical Region. The settlement includes the neighborhood of Agrež in the west and the hamlets of Suho and Vrhek to the northeast. The railway line from Ljubljana to Zagreb runs along the left bank of the Sava and there is a small railway station in the settlement.

== Name ==
Blanca was attested in written records in 1309 as Blanitz. The name is derived from *Blanica, a diminutive of the obsolete noun *blana (cf. Czech blana 'meadow, pasture', Belarusian balona 'empty land before a village', Bulgarian blana 'lawn, meadow'). The name therefore originally refers to the local geography.

== History ==
Prehistoric burial mounds were found in the area in 1892, testifying to early settlement. A school was established in 1874. During the Second World War, a ferry across the Sava in Blanca was used to main contact with Partisan units in Lower Carniola. A civic center was built in 1949, and a fire station in 1954. The settlement was supplied with running water from the Lopatec Reservoir in 1966.

== Hydroelectric Plant ==
A new run-of-the-river hydroelectric power plant on the Sava was built in the settlement between 2005 and 2008. It has an average yearly capacity of 144 GWh, corresponding to approximately 1% of current electricity production in Slovenia.

== Notable people ==
Notable people that were born or lived in Blanca include:

- Janez Boštjančič (1844–1892), journalist
- Drago Flis (a.k.a. "Strela") (1921–?), People's Hero of Yugoslavia
- Hinko Likar (1860–1925), technical writer and beekeeper
- Anton Omerza (1900–1938), communist volunteer in the Spanish Civil War
