= Blanca railway station =

Railway station in Blanca, Slovenia

Blanca
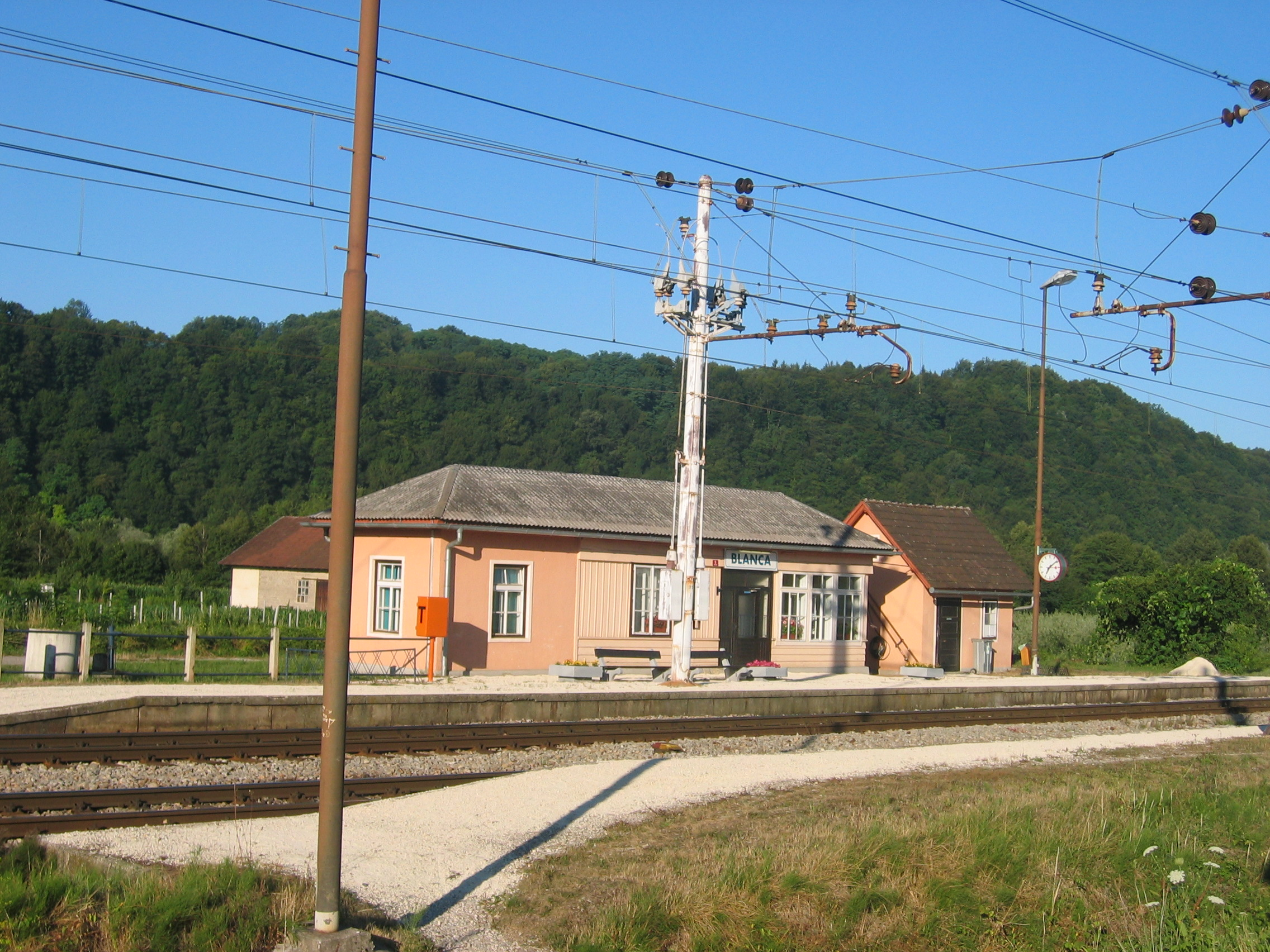

General information
- Location: 8283 Blanca; Slovenia
- Coordinates: 45°59′23″N 15°23′44″E
- Owner: Slovenian Railways
- Operator: Slovenian Railways
Location
- Location within Slovenia

Blanca railway station (Slovene: Železniška postaja Blanca) is the principal railway station in Blanca, Slovenia.
