= International Sava River Basin Commission =

Logo of the organisation.

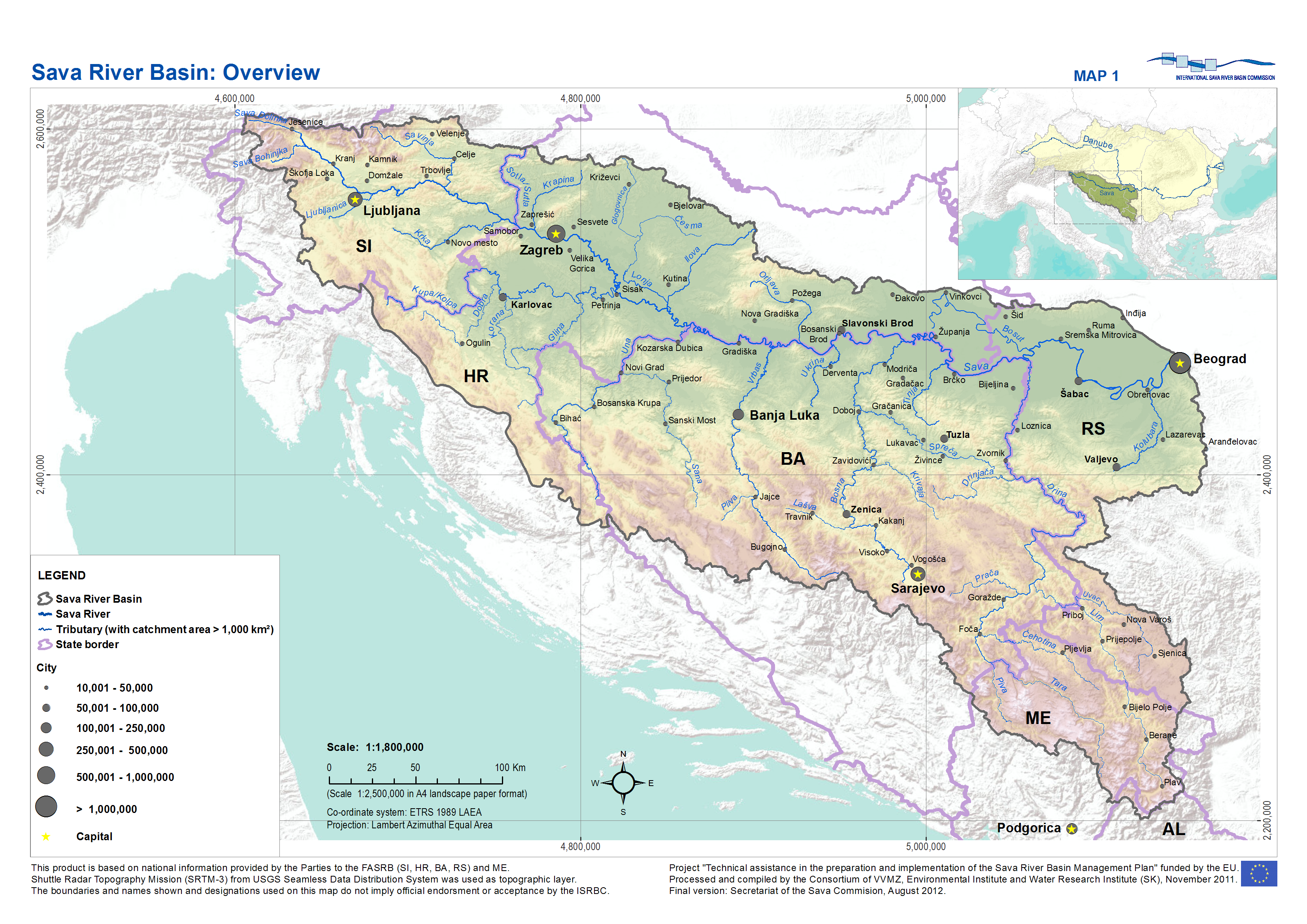
Sava River Basin

International Sava River Basin Commission is an international organisation with its permanent secretariat in Zagreb, Croatia. Sava Commission has been established for purpose of the implementation of the Framework Agreement on the Sava River Basin (FASRB), namely the provision of cooperation of the Parties to the FASRB, for realization of the following goals: establishment of an international regime of navigation on the Sava River, establishment of sustainable water management and undertaking of measures to prevent or limit hazards.

== History ==
After dissolution of the Socialist Federal Republic of Yugoslavia in the early 1990s, the Sava River, which was the biggest national river in Yugoslavia, has become an international river of 4 former Yugoslav republics. Following the support of the Stability Pact for South-Eastern Europe, four riparian countries of the Sava River Basin – Bosnia and Herzegovina, Federal Republic of Yugoslavia (succeeded by Serbia), Republic of Croatia and Republic of Slovenia entered into a process of cooperation known as "the Sava River Basin Initiative". As result of that, on the November 29, 2001 in Sarajevo was signed "Letter of Intent". After that the basin countries accepted a challenge and managed to conclude the Framework Agreement on the Sava River Basin (FASRB). The result of FASRB agreement, which integrated all aspects of the water resources management was established of International Sava River Basin Commission (ISRBC) for the implementation of the FASRB. FASRB entered into force on December 29, 2004, the First Constitutional Session of the Sava Commission was held on June 27, 2005, and the permanent Secretariat of the Sava Commission started to work on January 9, 2006.

State	length of the river	major cities
Slovenia	218 km	Ljubljana
Croatia	562 km	Zagreb, Sisak, Slavonski Brod, Županja
Bosnia and Herzegovina	331 km	Brod, Brčko
Serbia	206 km	Sremska Mitrovica, Šabac, Obrenovac, Belgrade

== See also ==
- Sava
- International Commission for the Protection of the Danube River
- Danube Commission (1948)
