= Tinja (river) =

Tinja Тиња

Location
- Country: Bosnia and Herzegovina

Physical characteristics
- Mouth
  - location: Sava
  - coordinates: 44.9278°N 18.7561°E
- Length: 99.4 km (61.8 mi)
- Basin size: 904 km^{2} (349 sq mi)

Basin features
- Progression: Sava→ Danube→ Black Sea

The Tinja (Cyrillic: Тиња) is a river of northeastern Bosnia and Herzegovina. It is a right tributary of the Sava, into which it flows near Brčko. It is 99.4 kilometres (61.8 mi) long and its drainage basin covers an area of 904 square kilometres (349 sq mi).
