= Sava =

River in Central Europe

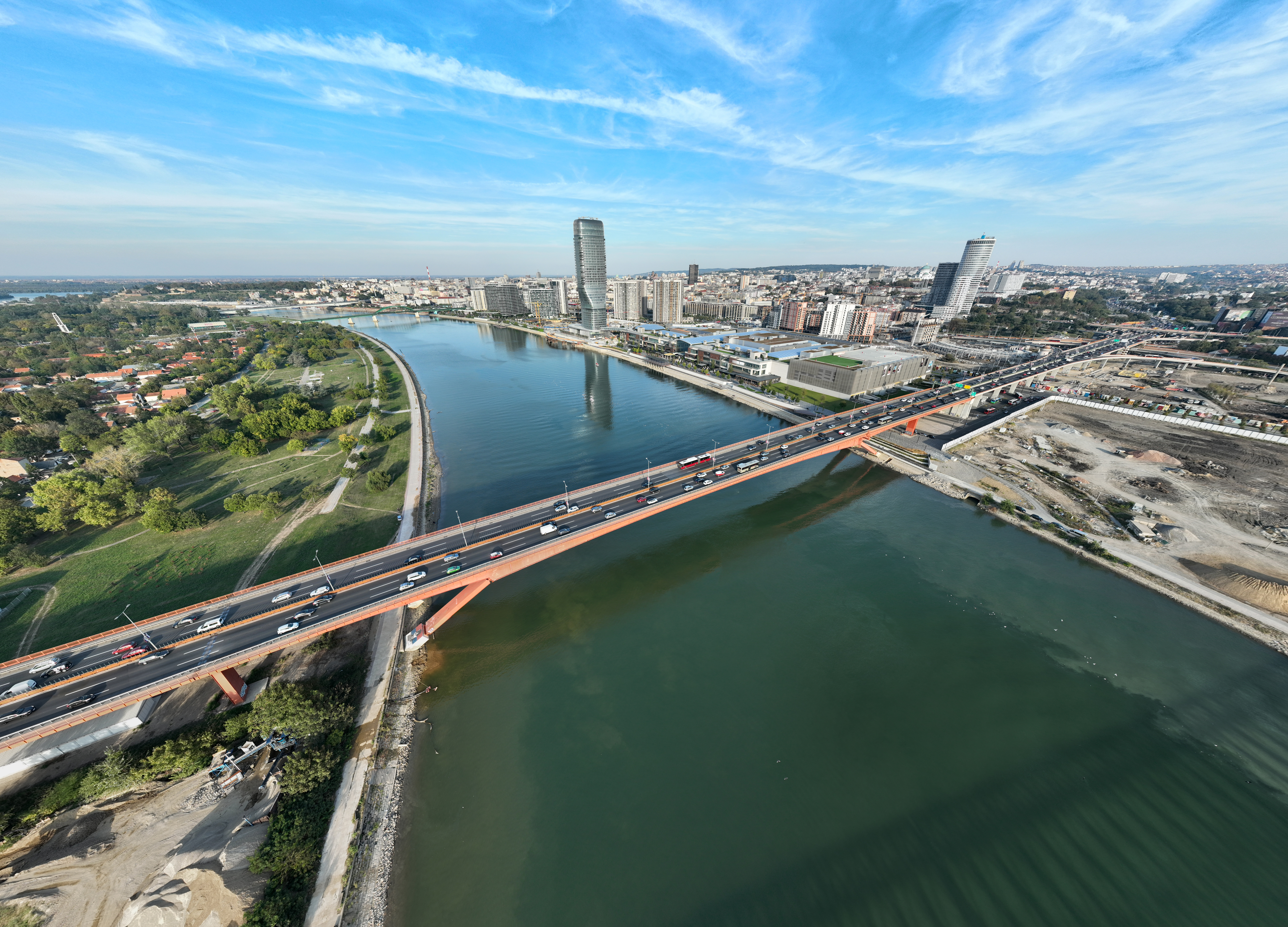
- The Sava in Belgrade, Serbia
- Native name: Sava (Slovene); Sava / Сава (Serbo-Croatian); Száva (Hungarian)

Location
- Countries: Slovenia; Croatia; Bosnia-Herzegovina; Serbia
- Cities: Kranj; Ljubljana; Zagreb; Sisak; Slavonski Brod; Brčko; Sremska Mitrovica; Šabac; Obrenovac; Belgrade

Physical characteristics
- Source: Zelenci
  - location: Kranjska Gora, Slovenia
  - coordinates: 46°29′31″N 13°44′16″E
  - elevation: 833 m (2,733 ft)
- Mouth: Danube
  - location: Belgrade, Serbia
  - coordinates: 44°49′27″N 20°26′38″E
  - elevation: 68 m (223 ft)
- Length: 992 km (616 mi) (Note: Including 45 km (28 mi) Sava Dolinka headwater)
- Basin size: 97,713.2 km^{2} (37,727.3 sq mi)
- Discharge
  - location: the river mouth
  - average: 1609 m^{3}/s (56800 cu ft/s)

Basin features
- Progression: Danube→ Black Sea
- Tributaries
  - left: Savinja, Sutla, Krapina, Lonja, Ilova-Trebež, Orljava, Bosut, Jarčina
  - right: Sora, Ljubljanica, Krka, Kupa, Una, Vrbas, Ukrina, Bosna, Tolisa, Tinja, Drina, Kolubara

The Sava (Note: English: /ˈsɑːvə/; Slovene pronunciation: [ˈsàːʋa], Serbo-Croatian pronunciation: [sǎːʋa]; Serbian Cyrillic: Сава, Hungarian: Száva) is a river in Central and Southeast Europe, a right-bank and the longest tributary of the Danube. From its source in Slovenia, it flows through Croatia and along its border with Bosnia and Herzegovina, and finally reaches Serbia, feeding into the Danube in its capital, Belgrade.

The Sava is 990 kilometres (615 miles) long, including the 45-kilometre (28 mi) Sava Dolinka headwater rising in Zelenci, Slovenia. It is the largest tributary of the Danube by volume of water, and the second-largest after the Tisza in terms of catchment area (97713km²) and length. It drains a significant portion of the Dinaric Alps region, through the major tributaries of Drina, Bosna, Kupa, Una, Vrbas, Lonja, Kolubara, Bosut and Krka. The Sava is one of the longest rivers in Europe and among the longest tributaries of another river.

The population in the Sava River basin is estimated at 8,176,000, and is shared by three capital cities: Ljubljana, Zagreb and Belgrade. The Sava is about 2/3-navigable for larger vessels: from the confluence of the Kupa in Sisak a few kilometers below Zagreb.

== Etymology ==
The name is believed to be derived from the Proto-Indo-European root *sewh_{1}- 'to press, push (forth); to take liquid, water' (whence the English word sup) and the ending *eh_{2}, so that it literally means 'that which waters [the ground]'. The ancient Greeks called it Saos (Ancient Greek: Σάος). Strabo writes in Geographica 4.6.10 (composed between 20 BC and AD 20) of the Saüs, and the Romans used the name Savus. Another name, used by Strabo for the Sava in its entirety or its lower part, is Noarus.

== Sources ==
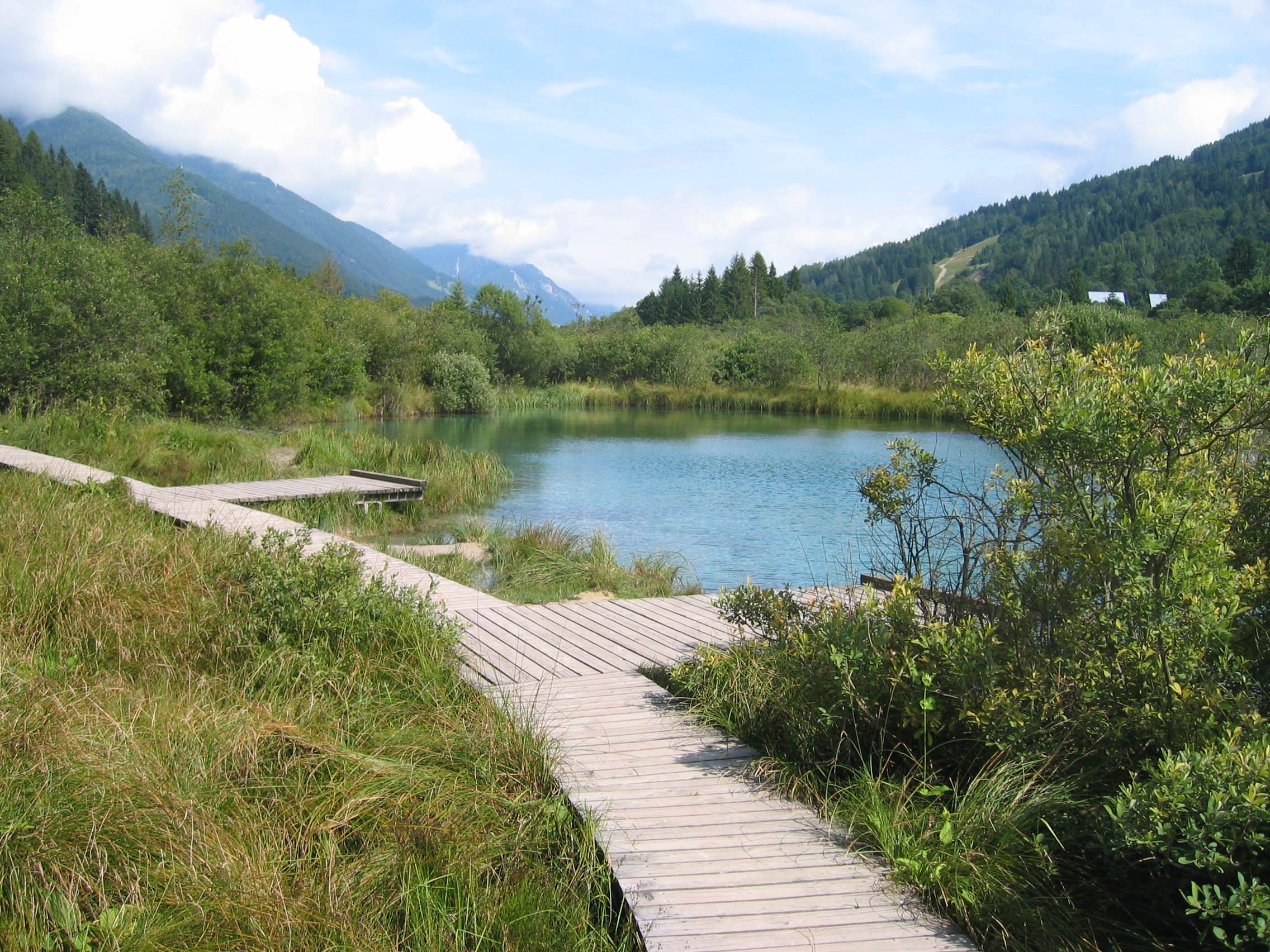
Zelenci Spring of the Sava Dolinka

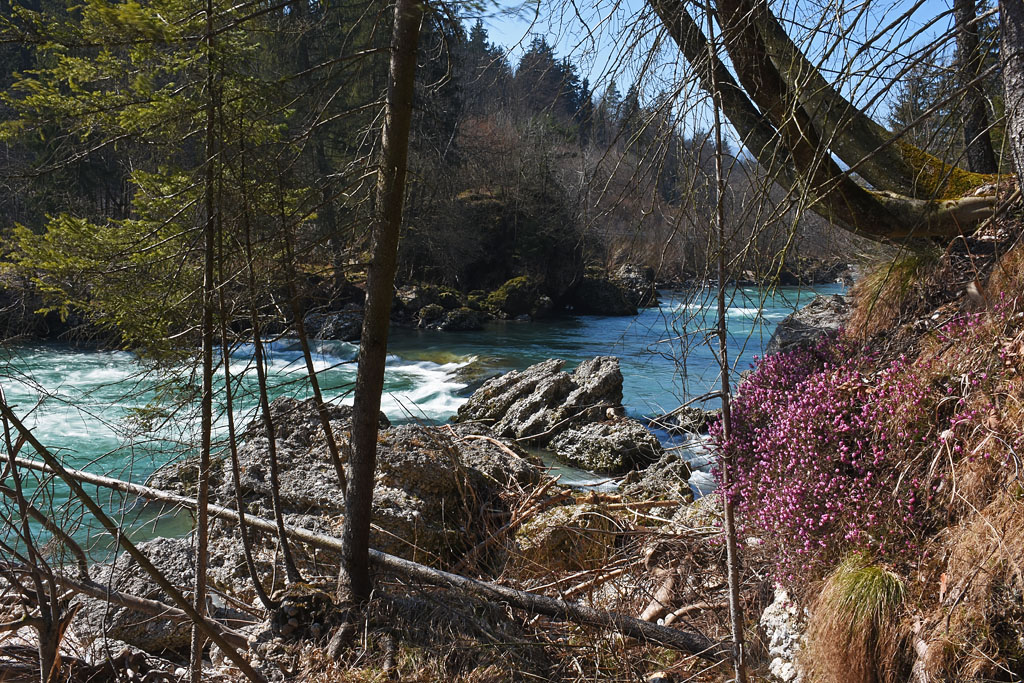
The Sava near Okroglo

The Sava River is formed from the Sava Dolinka and the Sava Bohinjka headwaters in northwest Slovenia. The drainage basin has other key tributaries, including the 52-kilometre (32 mi) Sora, the 27-kilometre (17 mi) Tržič Bistrica and the 17-kilometre (11 mi) Radovna rivers—flowing into the Sava at confluences as far east downstream as Medvode.

The Sava Dolinka rises at the Zelenci Pools near Kranjska Gora, Slovenia, in a valley separating the Julian Alps from the Karawanks mountain range. The spring is near the Slovene-Italian border at 833 metres (2,733 feet) above sea level, in a drainage divide between the Adriatic and Danube basins. The Sava Dolinka spring is fed by groundwater, possibly exhibiting bifurcation of source karst aquifer to the Sava and Soča basins. Nadiža creek, a short losing stream flowing nearby, is the source of Zelenci Pools water. The Sava Dolinka is considered the Sava's initial 45-kilometre (28 mi) segment.

The Sava Bohinjka originates in Ribčev Laz, at the confluence of the Jezernica, a short watercourse flowing out from Lake Bohinj, and the Mostnica River. Some sources define the Jezernica as a part of the Sava Bohinjka, specifying the latter as flowing directly out of the lake, while another group of sources include the Savica, rising at the southern flank of Triglav as the 78-metre (256 ft) Savica Falls, downstream from Triglav Lakes Valley, and flowing into the lake, as a part of the Sava Bohinjka. The watercourse flows 41 kilometres (25 miles)—including the length of the Savica—east to Radovljica, where it discharges into the Sava Dolinka. Downstream from the confluence, the river is referred to as the Sava.

== Course ==
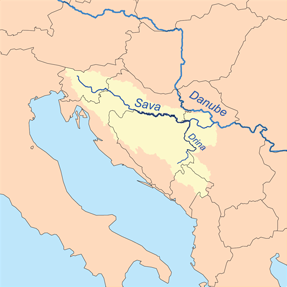
The Sava's drainage basin

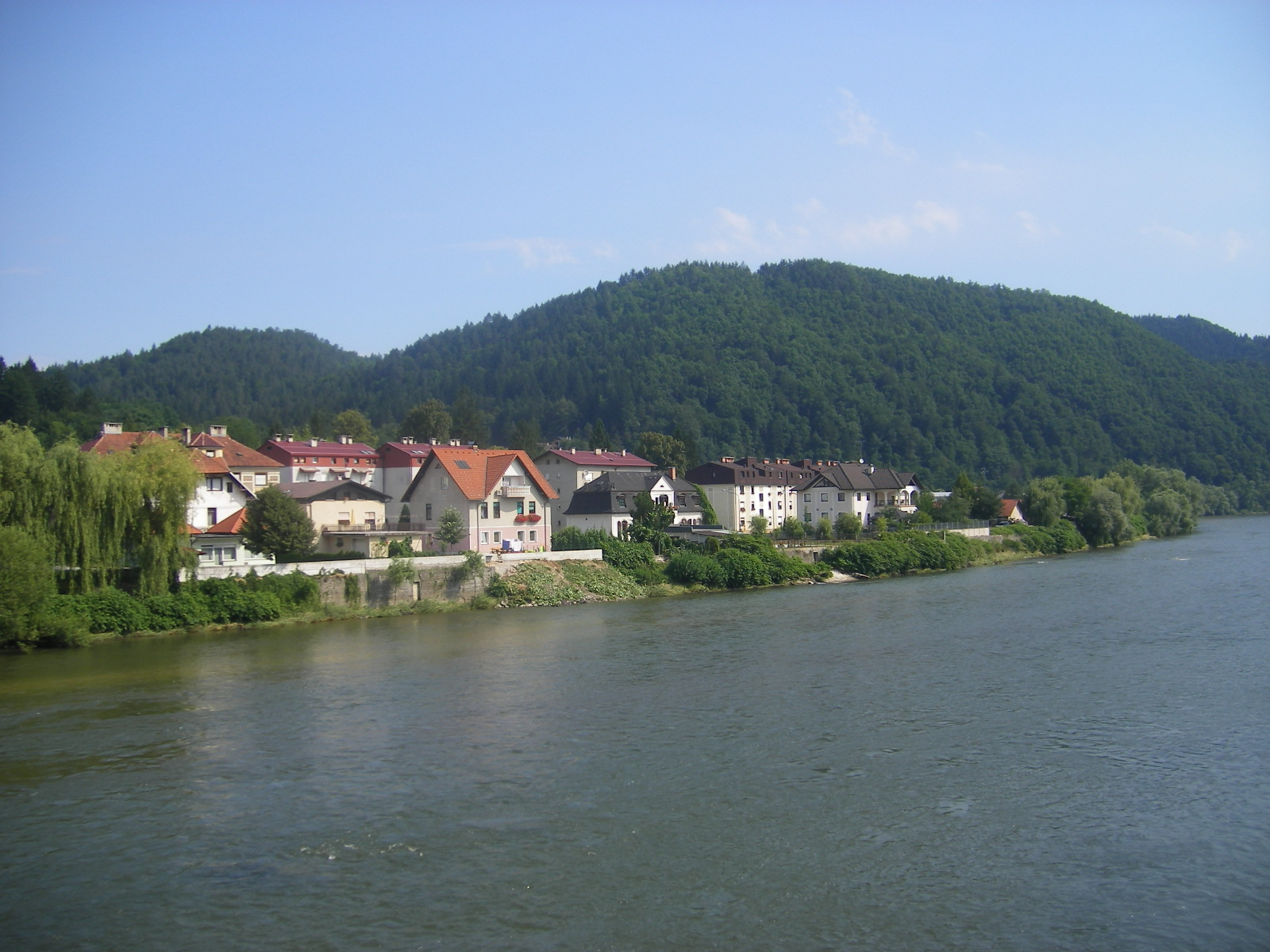
The Sava at Litija

The Sava spans Central-Southeast Europe, flowing through Slovenia, Croatia, Serbia and along the Bosnia-Herzegovina border. Its total length is 990 kilometres (615 miles), including the 45-kilometre (28 mi) Sava Dolinka and the 945-kilometre (587 mi) Sava proper. As a right tributary of the Danube, the river belongs to the Black Sea drainage basin. When the Sava Dolinka headwater is excluded from its course, the Sava River is the third longest tributary of the Danube, slightly shorter than the 966-kilometre (600 mi) Tisza and the 950-kilometre (590 mi) Prut—the Danube's two longest tributaries. It is also the largest tributary of the Danube by discharge. The river's course is sometimes used to describe the northern boundary of the Balkans, and the southern border of the Central Europe. Before the breakup of Yugoslavia in 1991 the Sava was the longest river lying completely within the country.

=== From the source to the Sutla ===
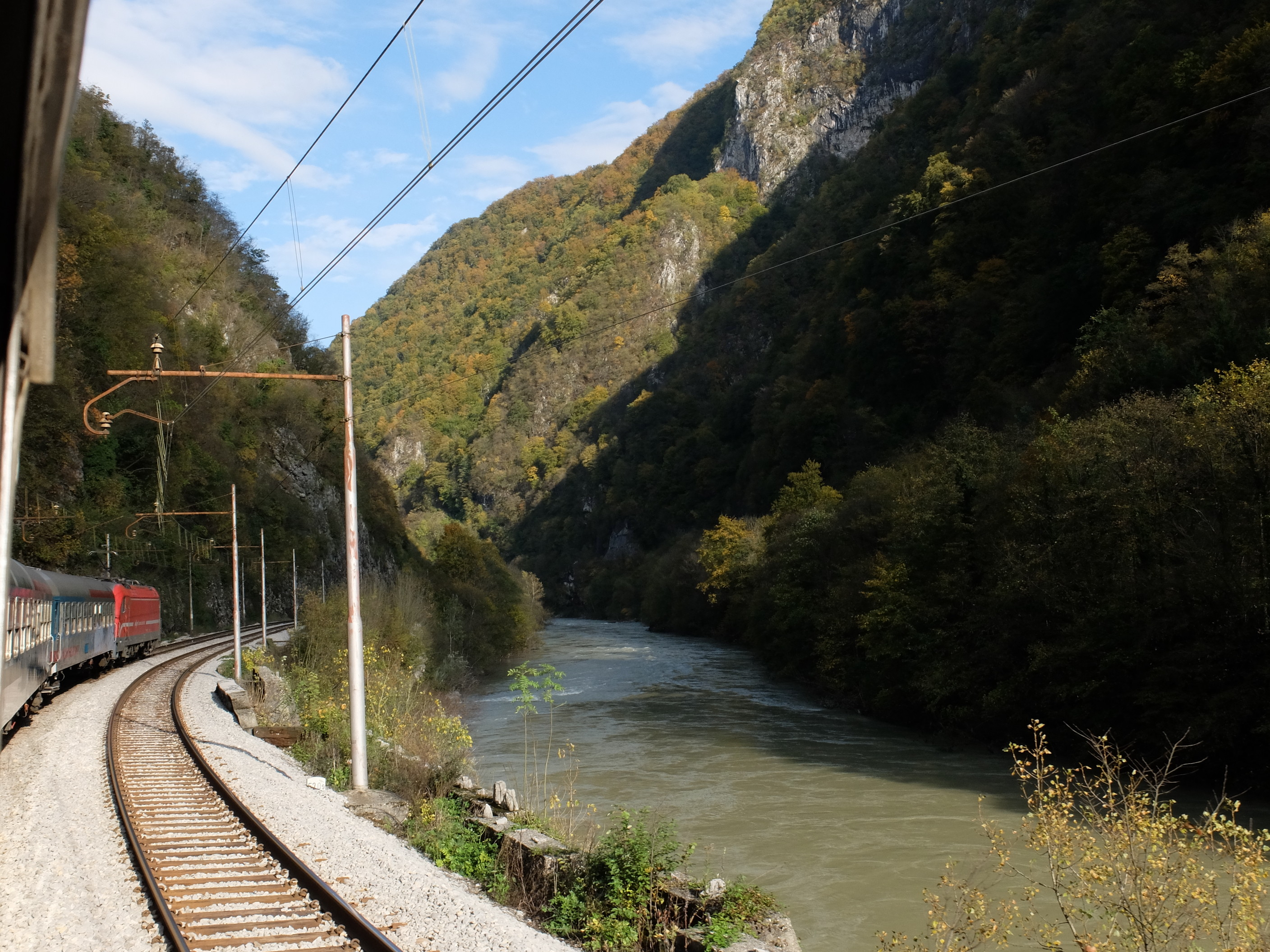
The Sava Gorge between Ljubljana and Trbovlje

The Sava Dolinka rises in the Zelenci Pools, west of Podkoren in the Upper Carniola region of Slovenia at 833 metres (2,733 feet) above sea level (a.s.l.), and flows east, past Kranjska Gora to Jesenice, where it turns southeast. At Žirovnica, the river enters the Ljubljana Basin and encounters the first hydroelectric dam—Moste plant—before proceeding to the east of the glacial Lake Bled towards Radovljica and confluence of the Sava Bohinjka, at 411 metres (1,348 feet) a.s.l. Downstream of Radovljica, the Sava proceeds southeast towards Kranj. Between Kranj and Medvode, its course comprises the Lake Trboje and the Lake Zbilje reservoirs, built for the Mavčiče and the Medvode power plants.

The Sava then flows through the capital of Slovenia, Ljubljana, where another reservoir is on the river, adjacent to the Tacen Whitewater Course. There the river's course turns east and leaves the Ljubljana Basin via Dolsko, at 261 metres (856 feet) a.s.l. (at confluence of the Ljubljanica and the Kamnik Bistrica). The course continues through the Sava Hills, where it passes the Litija Basin with the mining and industrial town of Litija, the Central Sava Valley with the mining towns of Zagorje ob Savi, Trbovlje, and Hrastnik, turns to the southeast and runs through the Lower Sava Valley with the towns of Radeče, Sevnica, and Krško. The course through the Sava Hills forms the boundary of traditional regions of Lower Carniola and Styria, At Radeče, the Vrhovo hydroelectric dam reservoir stands. The latter is site of the Krško Nuclear Power Plant, which uses the Sava River water to dissipate excess heat. The easternmost stretch of the Sava's course in Slovenia runs to the south of Brežice, where it is joined by the Krka, and the river ultimately becomes a border river between Slovenia and Croatia, marking 4 kilometres (2.5 miles) of their border near confluence of the Sutla (Slovene: Sotla). At that point, the Sava reaches 132 metres (433 feet) a.s.l. after flowing 221 kilometres (137 miles) through Slovenia and along its border.

=== From the Sutla to the Una ===
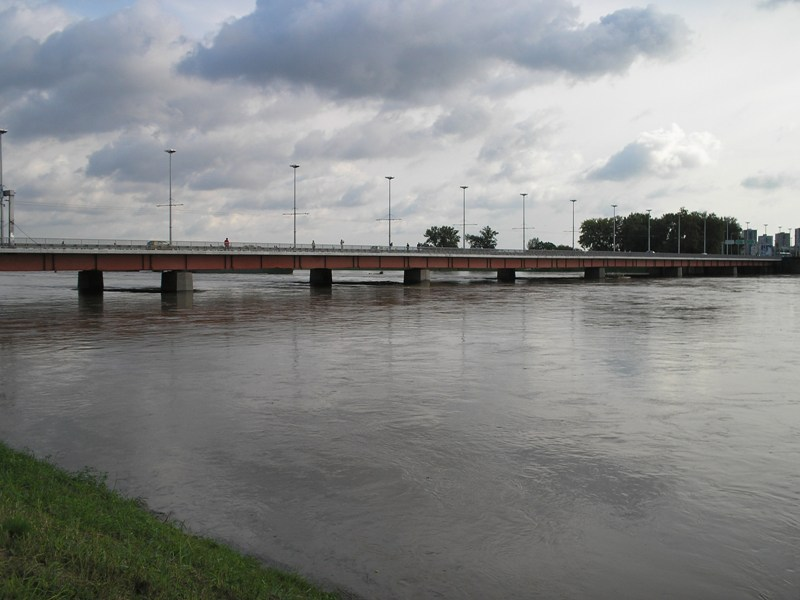
The Sava in Zagreb at the Youth Bridge on 13 February 2014 after record rainfall, which, combined with melting snow, expanded the river to three times its normal size, rising to a height of 347 cm and reaching the levees. At the time the picture was taken, the water level started subsiding and was at 287 cm. The trees in the water indicate the usual width of the river, around 100 m.

The westernmost part of the 562-kilometre (349 mi) Sava River's course in Croatia, takes the river east, through the western part of the Zagreb County, between Samobor and Zaprešić. The area encompasses forests interspersed by marshes and lakes formed in gravel pits. As the Sava approaches the capital of Croatia, Zagreb, the marshes give way to urban landscape, but there are surviving examples of the gravel pit lakes, such as the Jarun, and the Bundek within the city. At the western outskirts of Zagreb, there is the western terminus of the 32-kilometre (20 mi) Sava–Odra flood-relief canal connecting the Sava to the Odra River plain which is intended to act as flood control retention basin. The canal has been built in response to the most destructive flooding of the river that occurred in Zagreb in 1964, when one third of the city was flooded and 17 people were killed. The city itself marks the western extent of the Sava River basin area especially prone to flooding, spanning from Zagreb to confluence of the river in Belgrade, Serbia.

East of Zagreb, the river turns southeast again further through the Central Croatia, to the Sisak-Moslavina County, the city of Sisak, reaching 91.3 metres (300 feet) a.s.l. The city of Sisak marks the westernmost extent of the Sava River navigable to larger vessels. Navigation conditions on the river are poor due to limited draft and fairway width, meandering of the river, bridge clearance restrictions, poor fairway markings as well as presence of sunken vessels and other objects, including unexploded ordnance. The ordnance is left over from various conflicts including the World War II, Croatian War of Independence, Bosnian War, and the 1999 NATO bombing of Yugoslavia. Before reaching confluence of Una at Jasenovac and 86.8 metres (285 feet) a.s.l, the Sava River traces Lonjsko polje Nature Park, encompassing marshes frequently flooded by the Sava and its tributaries in the area.

=== From the Una to the Drina ===
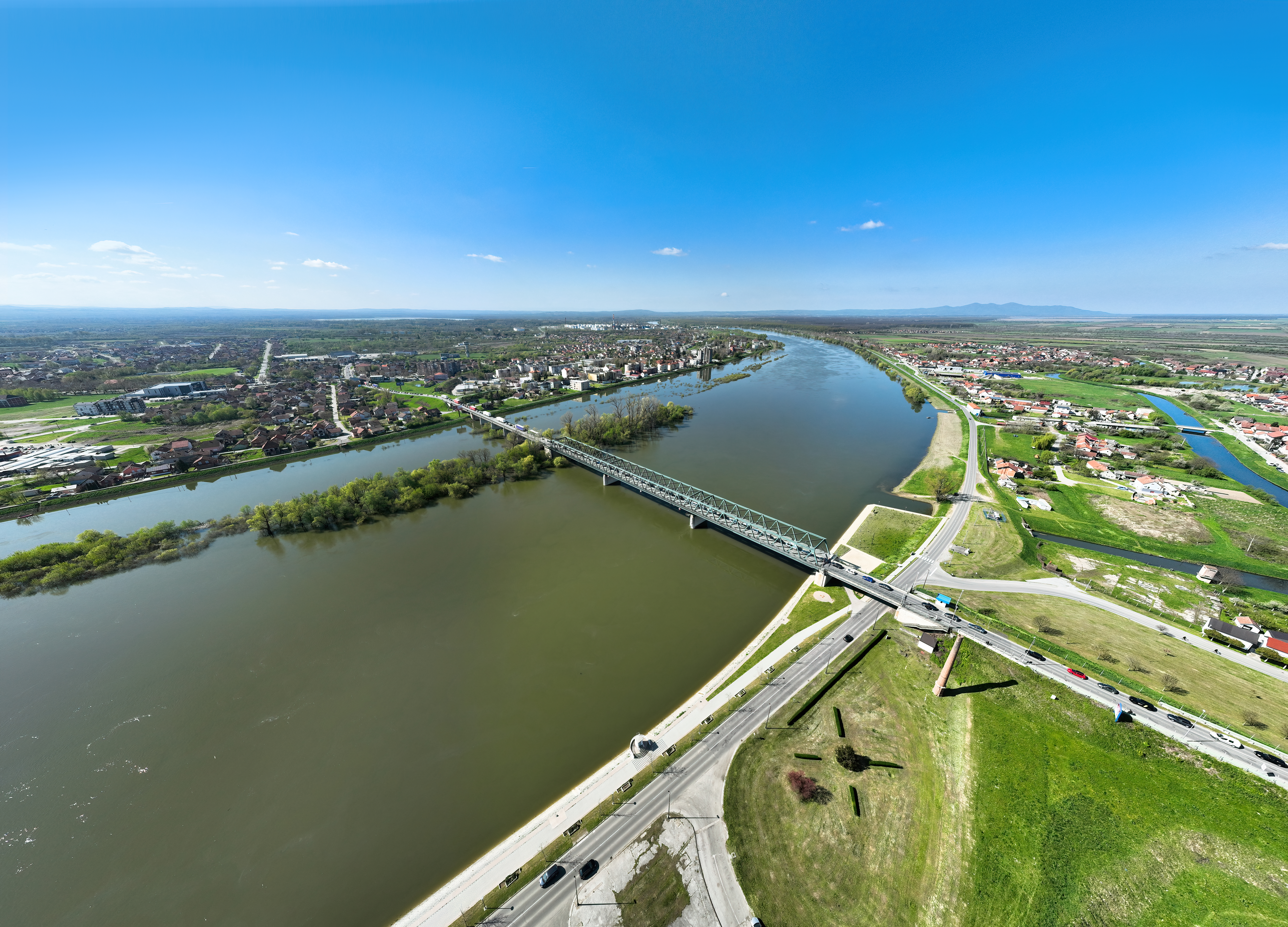
The Sava as a border river between Brod, Republika Srpska, BiH (left) and Slavonski Brod, Croatia (right)

Downstream of confluence of the Una River, the Sava is once again tracing an international border—between Croatia and Bosnia-Herzegovina. Its meandering course runs generally eastwards along Gradiška, and Slavonski Brod to Županja, where it turns south to Brčko. There, the river resumes its predominantly eastward course towards Sremska Rača and confluence of the Drina River. The right bank of the Sava, in this segment of its course, belongs to Bosnia-Herzegovina (with Bosnia's all three administrative entities, Republika Srpska, Federation of Bosnia and Herzegovina and the Brčko District, having gateway to the river), while the opposite bank belongs to Croatia and its Sisak-Moslavina, Brod-Posavina and Vukovar-Srijem counties, except in the area of Jamena and further downstream—which belongs to Serbia and the province of Vojvodina. No cities in this segment of the course span the river. It is an international frontier, three times seeing adjacent key settlements facing one another: Gradiška, Brod, and Brčko in Bosnia and Herzegovina, opposite Stara Gradiška, Slavonski Brod, and Gunja in Croatia.

The 337.2-kilometre (209.5 mi) segment between the Una and the Drina confluences, corresponding to the Sava flowing along the border of Bosnia-Herzegovina, exhibits small change of elevation, such as from 86.8 metres (285 feet) ASL at Jasenovac to 76.6 metres (251 feet) ASL at Brčko gauges: over 287.5 kilometres (178.6 miles) of the river between them. The river below Zagreb has a 0.4‰ slope (gradient) on average, much less steep than the course in Slovenia, where the average slope exceeds 0.7‰. This results in the Sava's meandering course running through a wide plain bordered by wetlands.

=== From the Drina to the Danube ===
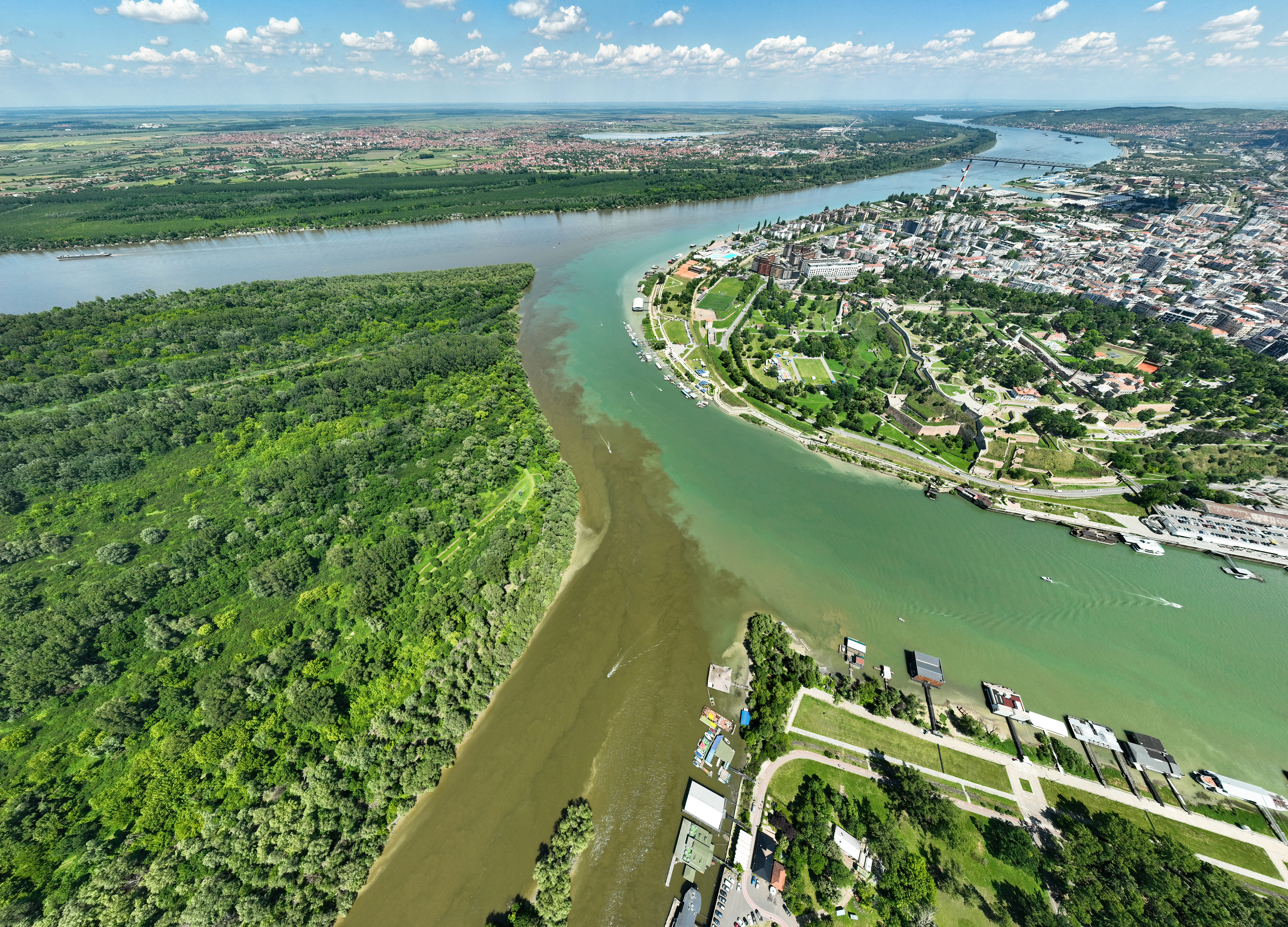
The confluence of the Sava (river on right side) into the Danube (river on left) near the right bank of the Great War Island and Kalemegdan

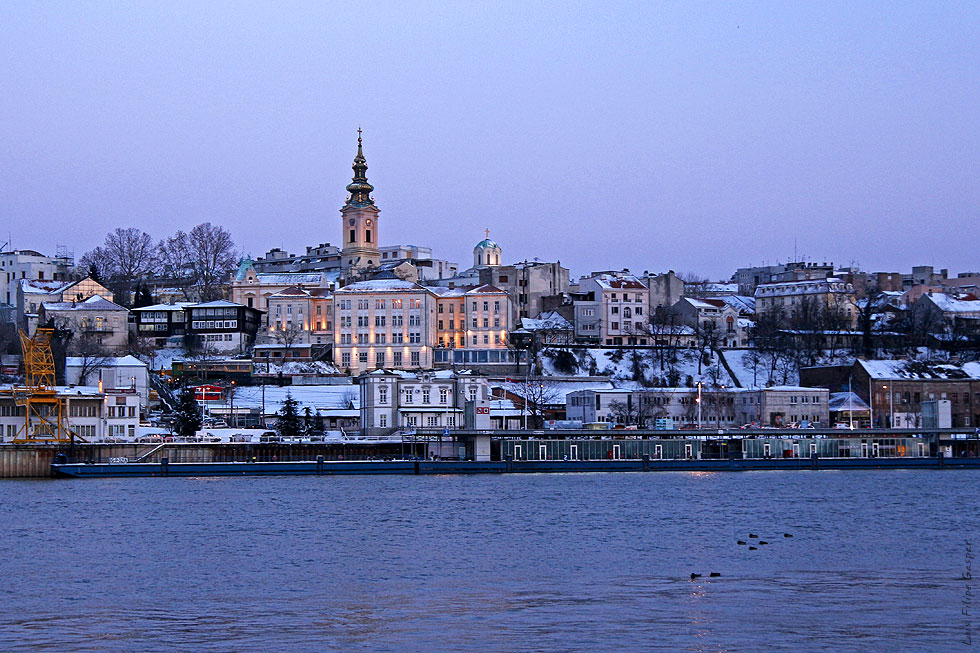
The Sava and the historical center of Belgrade

Downstream from the confluence of the Drina, the Sava River changes its eastward course to northeast, until it reaches Sremska Mitrovica, whence it flows southeast and then south to Šabac, before finally turning east towards Belgrade. Most of the river's course in Serbia represents a border between province of Vojvodina, on the left bank, and Central Serbia, on the right bank. Exceptions to that are in area around Sremska Mitrovica, where both banks are in Vojvodina, and downstream of Progar suburb of Belgrade where both banks are in Central Serbia. The river meanders and forms wetlands there as well—the most significant centering on Obedska bara oxbow lake. The Sava River forms several large islands in this segment of the course, with the largest among them—800-hectare (2,000-acre) Ada Ciganlija in Belgrade—connected to the right bank by a pair of artificial embankment dams forming Lake Sava since 1967.

The Sava discharges into the Danube, after reaching 68.3 metres (224 feet) a.s.l. as its right tributary at the Great War Island off the easternmost tip of Syrmia in Belgrade, 1,169.9 kilometres (726.9 miles) away from the Danube's confluence and the Black Sea.

=== Settlements ===
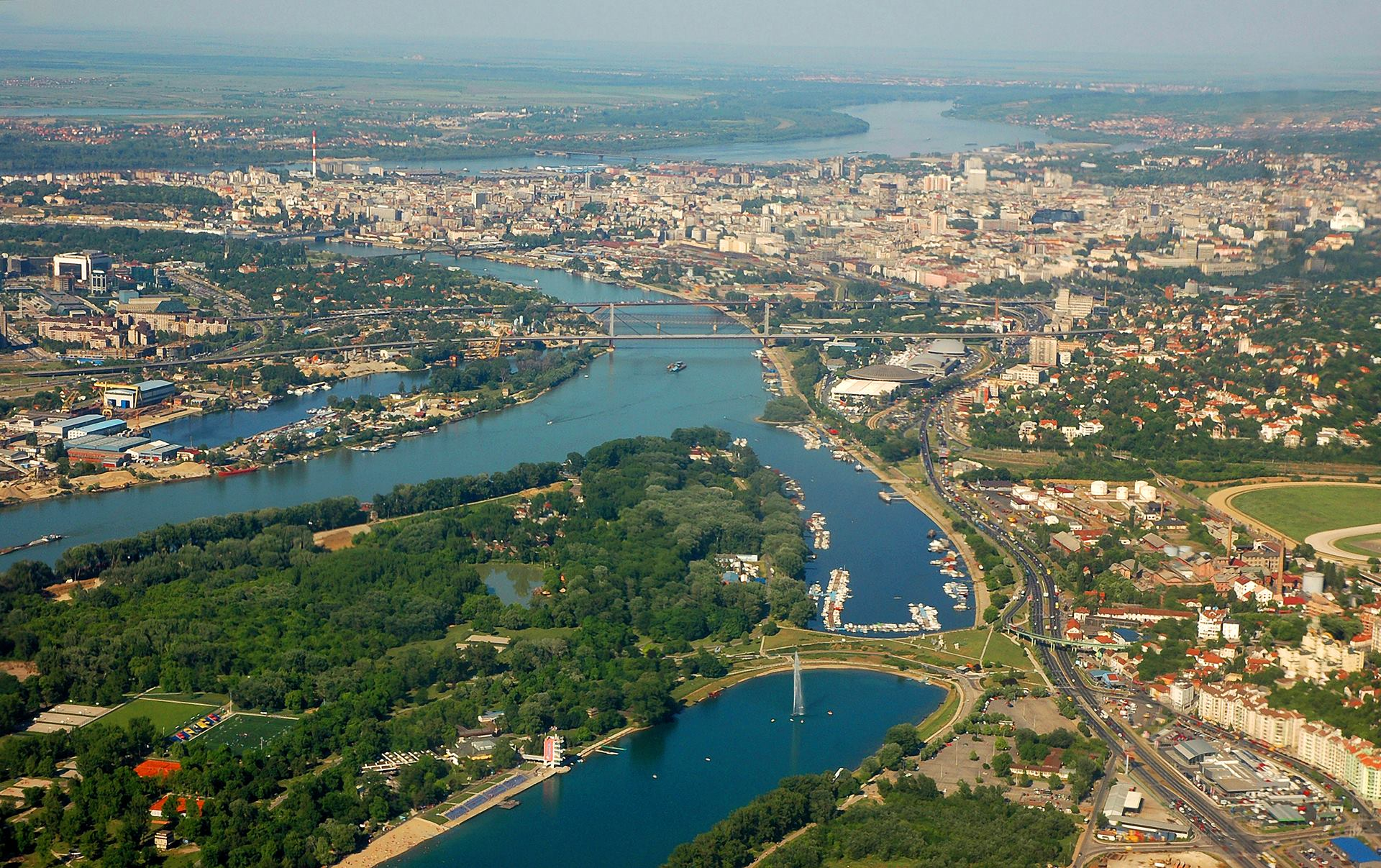
Belgrade

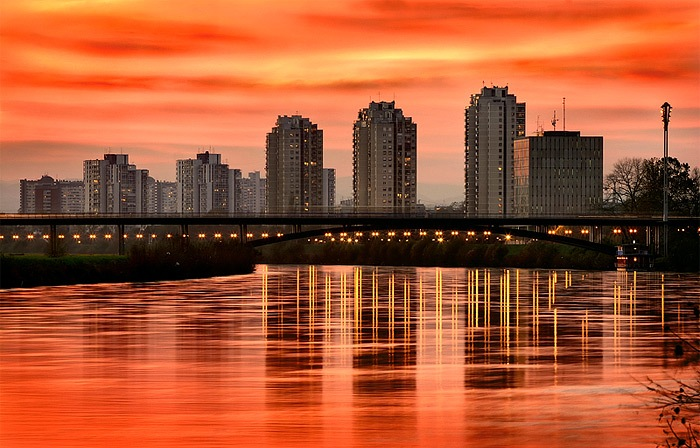
Zagreb

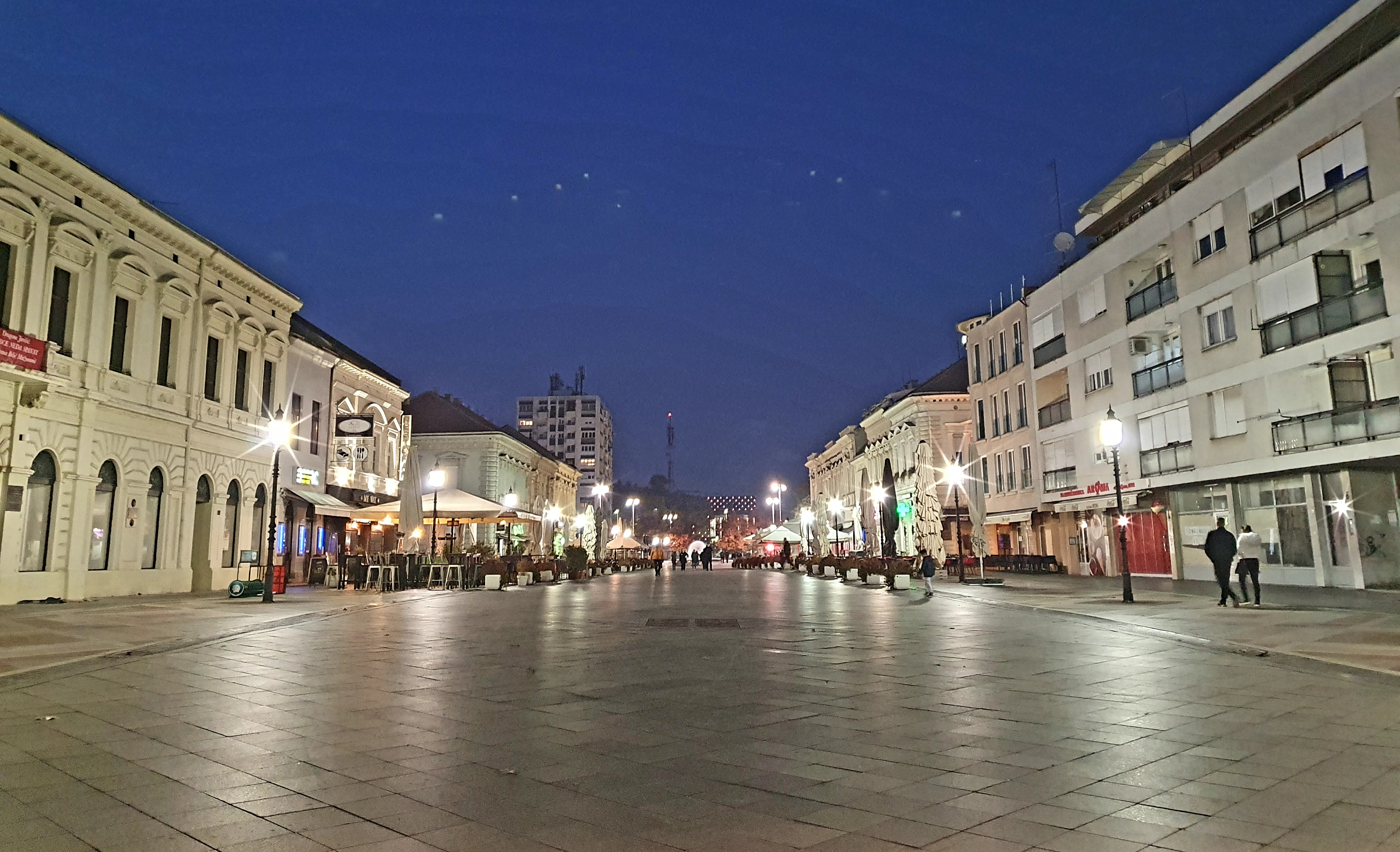
Slavonski Brod

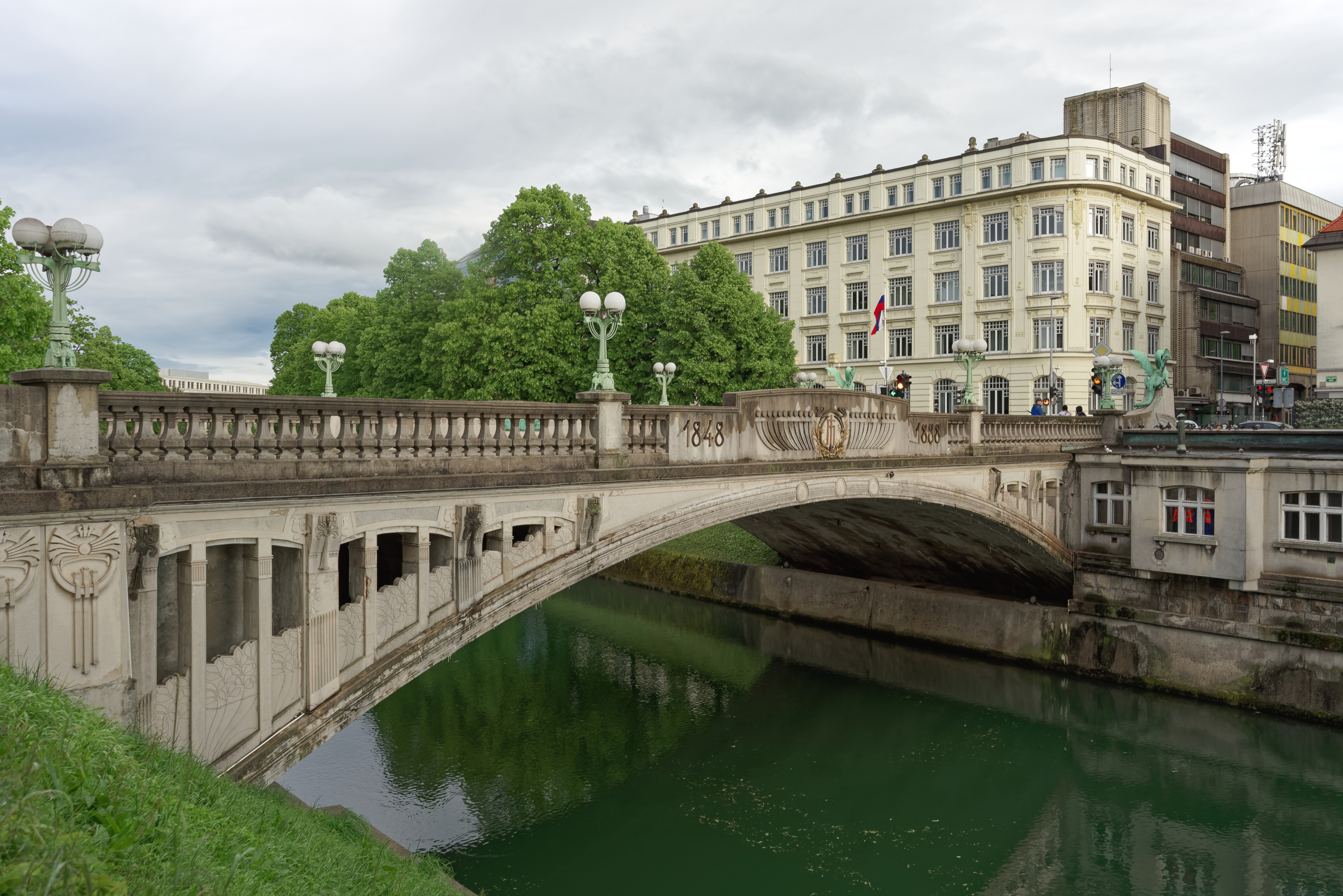
Ljubljana

Population in the Sava River basin is estimated at 8,176,000, and includes four capitals: Belgrade, Ljubljana, Sarajevo and Zagreb. All except Sarajevo, are on the river banks and represent the three largest settlements found along the river. Belgrade, at the lowest end of the river, is the largest city in the basin with urban population of 1,135,502. Ten municipalities of its outer conurbation have combined population of 1,283,783, taking in many mutual suburbs. The Belgrade metropolitan area has a population of 1,639,121. Zagreb is the second largest city on the river, comprising population of 688,163 living in the city itself, and 802,588 in the city-administered area. Together with the Zagreb County, largely corresponding to various definitions of the city's metropolitan area, it has a combined population of 1,110,517. Ljubljana is the third-largest city on the banks of the Sava, encompassing a population of 258,873 living in the city itself and 265,881 in the city-governed area.

The largest city of Bosnia-Herzegovina on the river is Brčko, whose urban population is estimated at 40,000. Other cities along the river, with populations of 20,000 and larger, are Slavonski Brod (53,473), Šabac (52,822), Sremska Mitrovica (37,586), Kranj (35,587), Sisak (33,049), Obrenovac (24,568), and Gradiška (est. 20,000).

The most populous urban areas along the Sava River
Rank	City	Country	Urban population	Municipal population
1	Belgrade	Serbia	1,233,350	1,659,440
2	Zagreb	Croatia	802,588	1,110,517
3	Ljubljana	Slovenia	295,504	537,893
4	Šabac	Serbia	51,163	105,432
5	Slavonski Brod	Croatia	45,005	49,891
6	Brčko	Bosnia-Herzegovina	40,000	85,000
7	Sremska Mitrovica	Serbia	37,586	79,773
8	Kranj	Slovenia	35,587	51,225
9	Sisak	Croatia	33,322	47,768
10	Obrenovac	Serbia	24,568	71,419

== Watershed ==
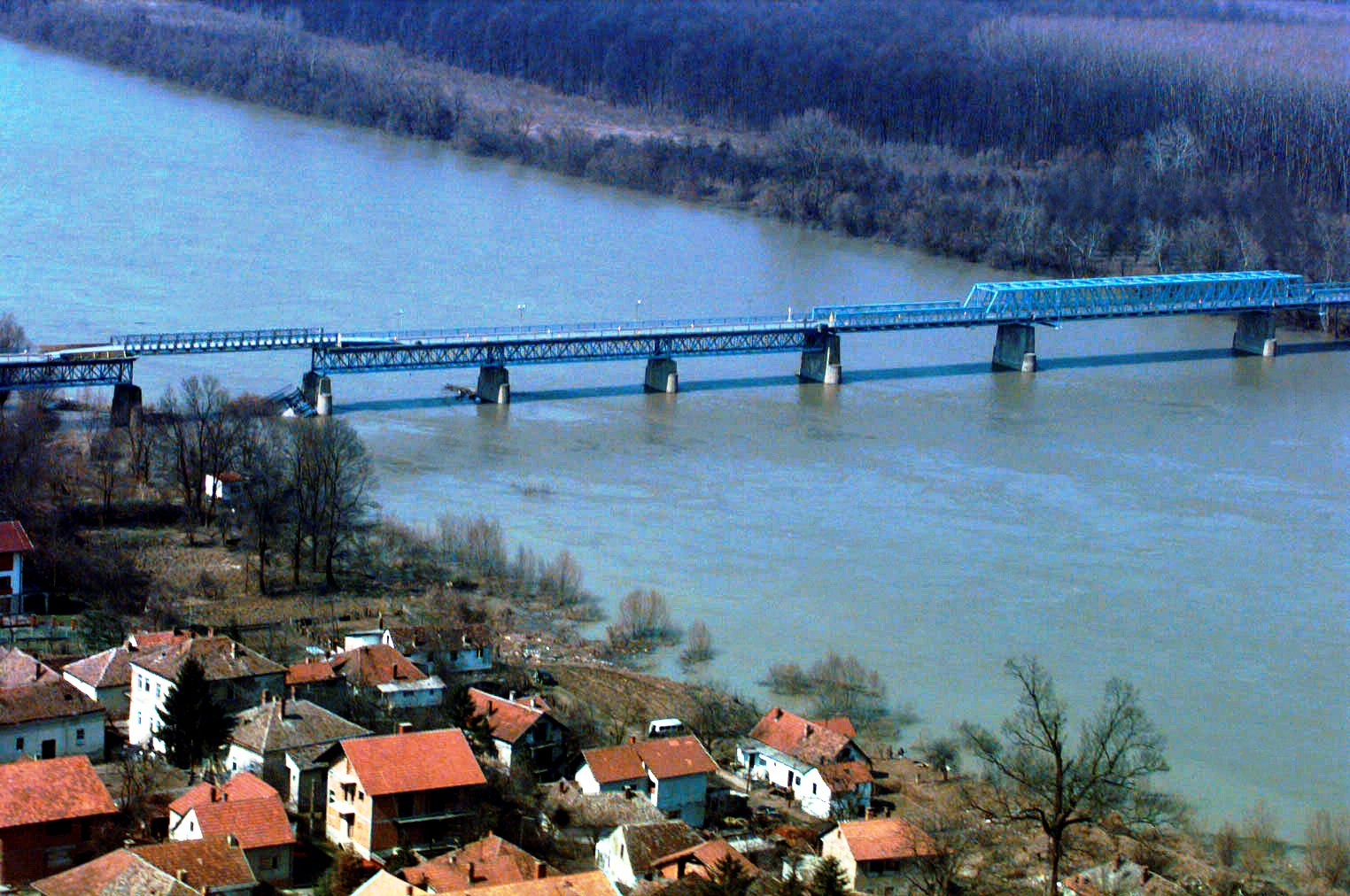
The Brčko Bridge between Brčko and Gunja in 1996. Wartime damage was repaired in 2000.

The Sava River basin covers a total area of 97713.2km² making it the second largest Danube tributary catchment by area size, surpassed only by the Tisza basin, and it encompasses 12% of the Danube basin, draining into the Black Sea. The Sava represents the third longest tributary of the Danube and its largest tributary by discharge. The catchment area borders the remainder of the Danube basin to the north and east, and the Adriatic Sea basin to the west and south. The river basin generally consists of parts of Bosnia-Herzegovina, Croatia, Montenegro, Serbia and Slovenia, with a very small part of the catchment area belonging to Albania. Topography of the basin varies significantly. Upstream portion of the basin is more rugged than downstream one, but asymmetry of the basin topography is particularly apparent when comparing right and left bank areas—the former dominated by the Alps and the Dinarides reaching elevations in excess of 2000m a.s.l, while the latter is dominated by the Pannonian Plain. The mean elevation of the basin is 545m a.s.l.

Country	Sava basin area	Share of national territory in the basin	Share of the Sava basin
Slovenia	11734.8 km^{2} (4530.8 sq mi)	52.8%	12.01%
Croatia	25373.5 km^{2} (9796.8 sq mi)	45.2%	25.97%
Bosnia-Herzegovina	38349.1 km^{2} (14806.7 sq mi)	75.8%	39.25%
Serbia	15147.0 km^{2} (5848.3 sq mi)	17.4%	15.50%
Montenegro	6929.8 km^{2} (2675.6 sq mi)	49.6%	7.09%
Albania	179.0 km^{2} (69.1 sq mi)	0.59%	0.18%
Source: International Sava River Basin Commission;

=== Major tributaries ===
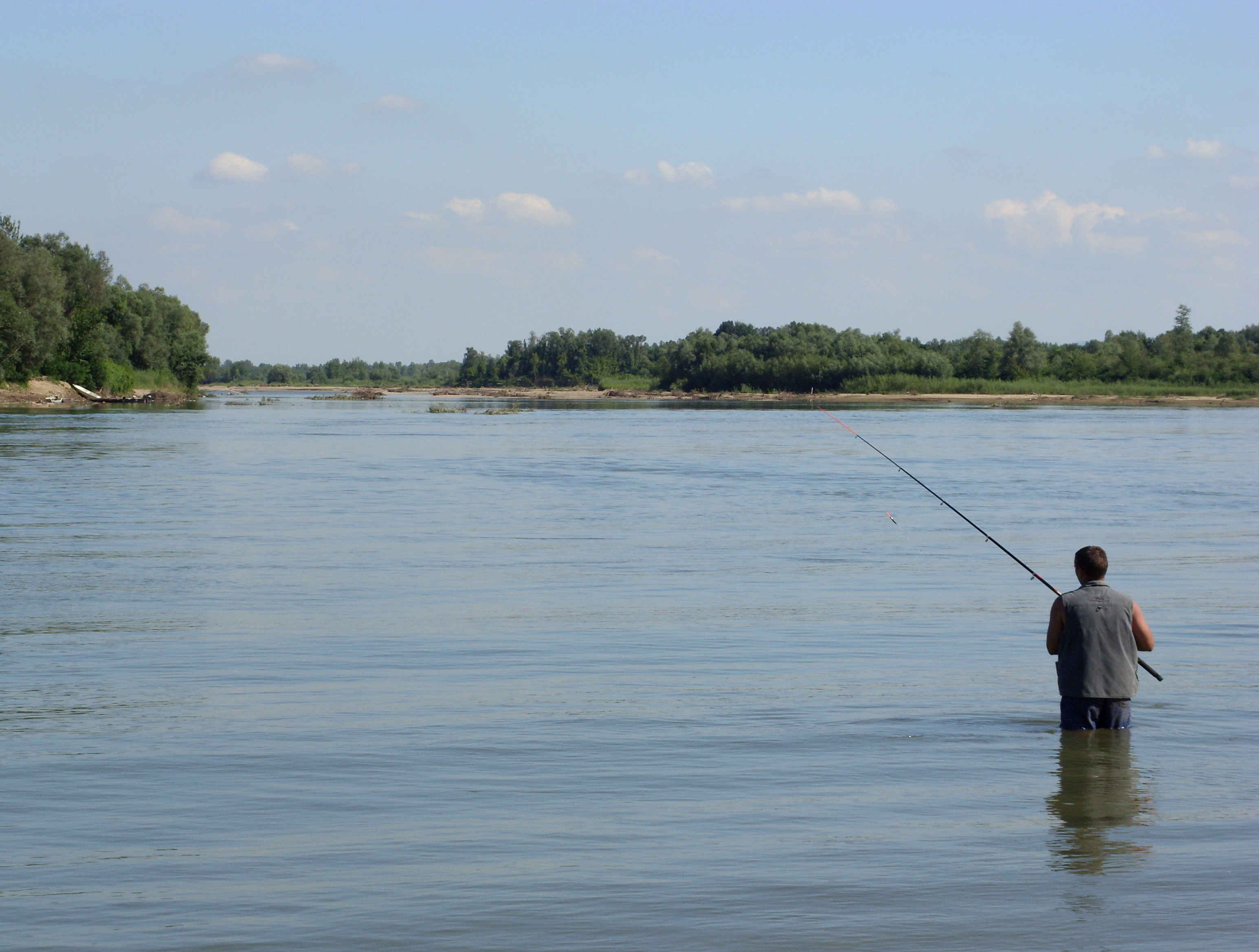
The confluence of the Sava and Drina

The most important tributaries of the Sava River found in its upper basin are characterized by relatively steep grades of flow, high flow velocities and rapids. Those are left tributaries: the Kokra, the Kamnik Bistrica and the Savinja; and right tributaries: the Sora, the Ljubljanica and the Krka (Sava). Further downstream larger rivers empty into the Sava, as the right bank of the basin grows steadily. Right tributaries in this lower segment of the basin start as fast flowing courses, only to slow down as they enter the Pannonian Basin. They include the Kupa, the Una, the Vrbas, the Ukrina, the Bosna, the Brka, the Tinja, the Drina and the Kolubara. Left tributaries in the lower segment drain plains consequently exhibiting less steep course grades, lower flow rates and meandering. They include the Sutla, the Krapina, the Lonja, the Ilova, the Orljava and the Bosut.

The 346km Drina is the largest tributary of the Sava, flowing in Bosnia-Herzegovina and along border of the country and Serbia. It is formed by the headwaters of the Tara and the Piva at the border of Bosnia-Herzegovina and Montenegro, near Šćepan Polje. Its 20319.9km² catchment extends across parts of four countries—reaching as far south as Albania. The Bosna and the Kupa river basins are the second and third largest catchments of the Sava tributaries, each surpassing 10000km² in size.

List of major tributaries of the Sava River
Left bank			Catchment area	Length	Confluence	Right bank		
Country	Region/County	Tributary	Catchment area	Length	Confluence	Tributary	Region/County	Country
Slovenia	Central Slovenia		1,860.0 km^{2} (718.2 sq mi)	41.0 km (25.5 mi)	46.075553°N 14.641857°E	Ljubljanica	Central Slovenia	Slovenia
Slovenia	Savinja	Savinja	1,849.0 km^{2} (713.9 sq mi)	93.9 km (58.3 mi)	46.085733°N 15.178471°E		Savinja	Slovenia
Slovenia	Lower Sava		2,247.0 km^{2} (867.6 sq mi)	94.6 km (58.8 mi)	45.893772°N 15.601187°E	Krka	Lower Sava	Slovenia
Croatia	Zagreb	Sutla	584.3 km^{2} (225.6 sq mi)	88.6 km (55.1 mi)	45.864015°N 15.684614°E		Lower Sava	Slovenia
Croatia	Zagreb	Krapina	1,237.0 km^{2} (477.6 sq mi)	66.9 km (41.6 mi)	45.827244°N 15.823359°E		Zagreb	Croatia
Croatia	Sisak-Moslavina		10225.6km2	297.4km	45.460793°N 16.398296°E	Kupa	Sisak-Moslavina	Croatia
Croatia	Sisak-Moslavina	Lonja	4259.0km2	49.1km	45.363846°N 16.753807°E		Sisak-Moslavina	Croatia
Croatia	Sisak-Moslavina	Ilova-Trebež	1796.0km2	104.6km	45.348707°N 16.772604°E		Sisak-Moslavina	Croatia
Croatia	Sisak-Moslavina		9828.9km2	214.6km	45.27096°N 16.918516°E	Una	Border river at the confluence	
Croatia	Brod-Posavina		6,273.8 km^{2} (2,422.3 sq mi)	249.7 km (155.2 mi)	45.107939°N 17.51328°E	Vrbas	Republika Srpska	Bosnia-Herzegovina
Croatia	Brod-Posavina	Orljava	1,618.0 km^{2} (624.7 sq mi)	87.6 km (54.4 mi)	45.106773°N 17.724724°E		Republika Srpska	Bosnia-Herzegovina
Croatia	Brod-Posavina		1,504.0 km^{2} (580.7 sq mi)	80.7 km (50.1 mi)	45.088702°N 17.936854°E	Ukrina	Republika Srpska	Bosnia-Herzegovina
Croatia	Brod-Posavina		10,809.8 km^{2} (4,173.7 sq mi)	281.6 km (175.0 mi)	45.066792°N 18.466043°E	Bosna	Federation of Bosnia and Herzegovina	Bosnia-Herzegovina
Croatia	Vukovar-Srijem		904.0 km^{2} (349.0 sq mi)	99.4 km (61.8 mi)	44.927893°N 18.75628°E	Tinja	Brčko District	Bosnia-Herzegovina
Serbia	Vojvodina		20,319.9 km^{2} (7,845.6 sq mi)	346.0 km (215.0 mi)	44.891968°N 19.355249°E	Drina	Border river at the confluence	
Serbia	Vojvodina	Bosut	2,943.1 km^{2} (1,136.3 sq mi)	186.0 km (115.6 mi)	44.941443°N 19.369583°E		Vojvodina	Serbia
Serbia	Central Serbia		3,638.4 km^{2} (1,404.8 sq mi)	86.6 km (53.8 mi)	44.662152°N 20.248532°E	Kolubara	Central Serbia	Serbia
Notes: Country/region/county of location of confluence with Sava corresponding to tributary bank side; The list includes rivers with catchment areas greater than 900 square kilometres (350 square miles), with addition of Sutla. Source: International Sava River Basin Commission;

== Hydrology ==
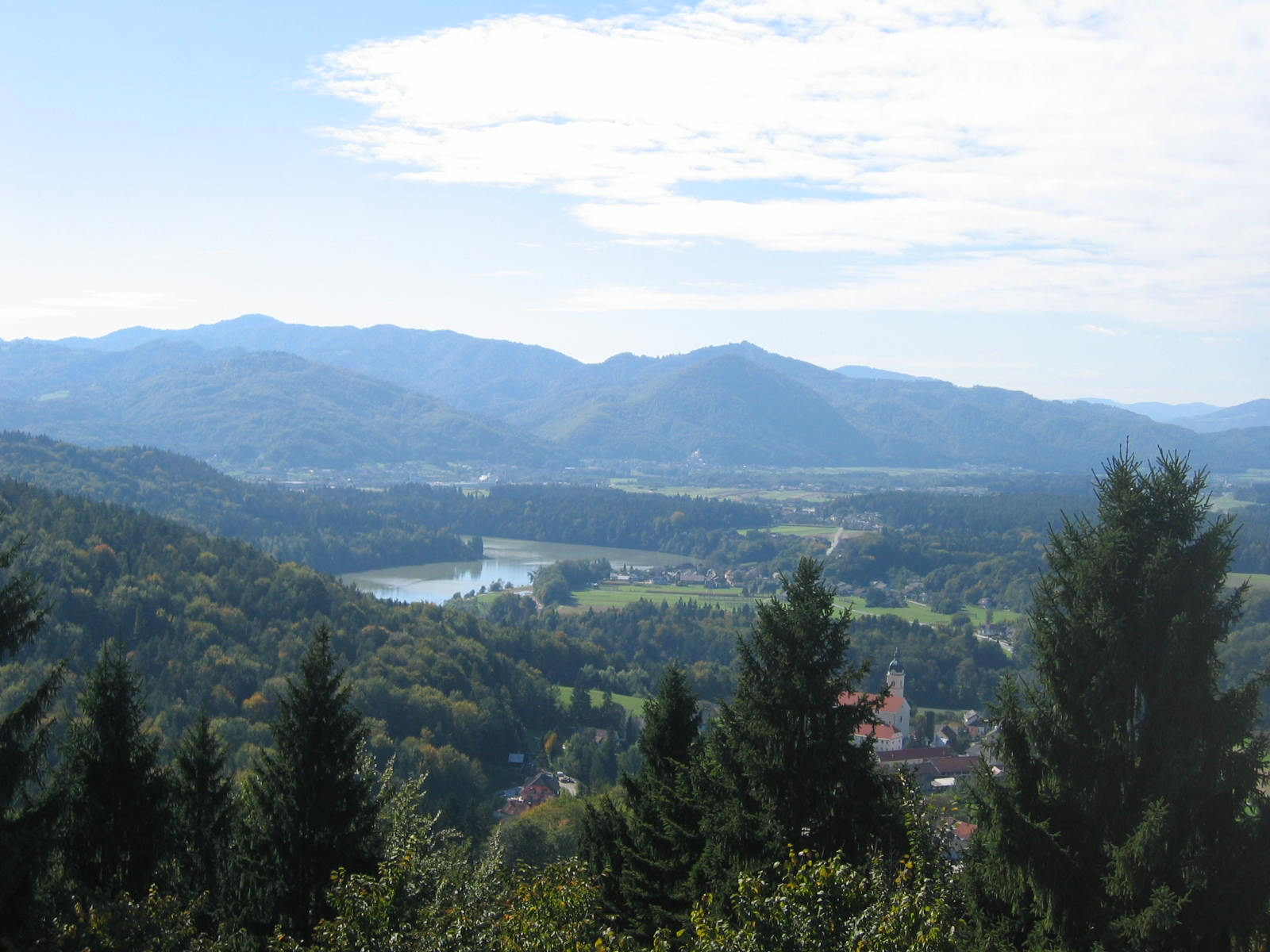
Lake Zbilje upstream from Medvode

The average annual flow rate of the Sava River at Radovljica, immediately downstream of the Sava Dolinka and the Sava Bohinjka confluence, stands at 44.9 cubic metres (1,590 cubic feet) per second. Downstream of the Krka confluence the average flow rate reaches 317 cubic metres (11,200 cubic feet) per second, gradually increasing as tributaries discharge along the course—340 cubic metres (12,000 cubic feet) per second downstream of the Sutla, 880 cubic metres (31,000 cubic feet) per second following discharge of the Kupa and the Una, 990 cubic metres (35,000 cubic feet) per second downstream of the Vrbas confluence, 1,180 cubic metres (42,000 cubic feet) per second after the Bosna river empties into the Sava, and finally of 1,564 cubic metres (55,200 cubic feet) per second at confluence of the Sava in Belgrade. The highest flow rate of 6,007 cubic metres (212,100 cubic feet) per second was recorded by Slavonski Šamac gauging station in May 2014.

Seven out of eight largest reservoirs in the Sava River basin are in the Drina catchment, the largest among them being the 0.88-cubic-kilometre (0.21 cu mi) Lake Piva on the eponymous river in Montenegro, created after construction of Mratinje Dam. Overall, there are 22 reservoirs holding more than 5,000,000 cubic metres (180,000,000 cubic feet) of water in the basin, with four of them on the Sava, including one on the Sava Dolinka. Most of the reservoirs are used primarily, or even exclusively, for electricity generation, but they are also used as supply of drinking water, industrial water source, for irrigation and food production.

Groundwater is a very important resource in the Sava River basin, generally used for public water supply of potable water, as a source of water for industrial use, but also as the mainstay of aquatic ecosystems. There are 41 identified significant groundwater bodies in the Sava River basin of basin-wide importance, ranging in area size from 97 to 5,186 square kilometres (37 to 2,002 square miles), as well as numerous minor ground water bodies. Even though most of them are transboundary waters, eleven are considered to be largely in Slovenia, fourteen in Croatia, seven in Bosnia-Herzegovina, five in Serbia and four in Montenegro.

== Discharge ==
Mean annual discharge of the Sava River at Zagreb (period from 1992 to 2019), Sremska Mitrovica and Belgrade (period from 1992 to 2021):

Year	Mean annual discharge (m³/s)		
Year	Belgrade	Sremska Mitrovica	Zagreb
1992	1537	1474	313
1993	1178	1121	251
1994	1595	1531	255
1995	1676	1610	281
1996	1958	1888	377
1997	1555	1492	264
1998	1534	1471	302
1999	1838	1770	297
2000	1360	1300	269
2001	1676	1610	266
2002	1543	1480	221
2003	1055	1000	146
2004	1828	1760	316
2005	1899	1830	271
2006	1757	1690	275
2007	1228	1170	234
2008	1340	1280	315
2009	1442	1380	314
2010	2418	2338	399
2011	961	908	183
2012	1157	1096	183
2013	1859	1793	382
2014	2316	2245	472
2015	1533	1470	249
2016	1615	1550	310
2017	1289	1234	289
2018	1665	1595	312
2019	1380	1320	314
2020	1065	1010	
2021	1513	1450	
2022		1110	
2023		1900	

== Geology ==
The course of the Sava River runs through several diverse geological units and orographic regions. The uppermost course of the river and its headwaters in the Karawanks area, is in the Southern Alps, tracing the Sava Fault—itself running parallel to the Periadriatic Seam. Mesozoic and Upper Triassic rocks are exposed in the region. The Ljubljana Basin represents the boundary of the Southern Alps and the Dinarides. Valleys of the Sava Dolinka and the Sava Bohinjka are glacial valleys, carved out by the Sava Dolinka and Bohinj glaciers advancing down Karawanks range to vicinity of present-day Radovljica. In the late Pleistocene, Bohinj Glacier was the largest glacier in the territory of present-day Slovenia, up to 900 metres (3,000 feet) thick. Sava Folds, southeast and east of the Ljubljana Basin are thought of as a part of the Dinarides, separating the Ljubljana and Krško Basins, and forming the Sava Hills. The east–west oriented folds are younger than the Miocene and the folding is considered to have taken place in the Pliocene and the Quaternary, but it is possible that the tectonic activity continues in the present day. The Sava Folds largely exhibit Paleozoic and Triassic rocks, and clastic sediments.

The lower course of the Sava in the Pannonian Basin—first reached by the Sava River in the Krško Basin on the western rim of the Pannonian Basin. The Pannonian Basin took shape through Miocenian thinning and subsidence of crust structures formed during Late Paleozoic Variscan orogeny. The Paleozoic and Mesozoic structures are visible in Papuk and other Slavonian mountains. The processes also led to the formation of a stratovolcanic chain in the basin 17–12 Mya (million years ago) and intensified subsidence observed until 5 Mya as well as flood basalts about 7.5 Mya. Contemporary uplift of the Carpathian Mountains prevented water flowing to the Black Sea, and the Pannonian Sea formed in the basin. Sediments were transported to the basin from uplifting Carpathian and Dinaric mountains, with particularly deep fluvial sediments being deposited in the Pleistocene during the uplift of the Transdanubian Mountains. Ultimately, up to 3,000 metres (9,800 feet) of the sediment was deposited in the basin, and the Pannonian sea eventually drained through the Iron Gate gorge. In the southern Pannonian Basin, the Neogene to Quaternary sediment depth is normally lower, averaging 500 to 1,500 metres (1,600 to 4,900 feet), except in central parts of depressions formed by subduction. A subduction zone formed in the present-day Sava River valley, and approximately 4,000 metres (13,000 feet) deep sediments were deposited in the Slavonia-Syrmia depression and 5,500 metres (18,000 feet) in the Sava depression. The results of those processes are large plains in the Sava River valley and the Kupa River valley. The plains are interspersed by the horst and graben structures, believed to have broken the Pannonian Sea surface as islands, which became watershed between Drava and Sava River basins extending along Ivanščica–Kalnik–Bilogora–Papuk mountain chain. The Papuk Mountain is flanked by the Krndija and the Dilj Hills on the eastern rim of the Požega Valley. The Bilogora, Papuk and Krndija Mountains consist mostly of Paleozoic rocks which are 300–350 million years old, while the Dilj consists of much more recent Neogene rocks, 2–18 million years old. Further east of the chain, the watershed runs through the Đakovo–Vinkovci and Vukovar Plateau. The loess plateau, extending eastward from Dilj and representing the watershed between the Vuka and Bosut rivers, gradually rises to the Fruška Gora south of Ilok.

== Economy ==
=== Electric power generation ===
There are 18 hydroelectric power plants with power generation capacity exceeding 10 Megawatts in the Sava River basin. In Slovenia, most of them harness the Sava itself. In other countries, the hydroelectric power plants are on its tributaries. Total power generation capacity of the 18 power plants, and additional smaller plants largely found in Slovenia, amounts to 41542 megawatts, and their annual production capacity stands at 2,497 gigawatt-hours. Approximately 3.3 cubic kilometres (0.79 cubic miles) of water per year in the river's basin is used to cool thermoelectric and nuclear power plants. Power plant cooling represents the main type of use of the Sava River waters.

As of October 2012, there are six existing hydroelectric power plants built along the Sava River. Upstream of Ljubljana there are Moste, Mavčiče and Medvode power plants, while Vrhovo, Boštanj and Blanca are downstream of the capital. There is one additional plant under construction near Krško. The Krško hydroelectric power plant, as well as two additional plants planned on the Sava River course downstream of Ljubljana—Brežice and Mokrice—should be completed by 2018. The power plants downstream of Ljubljana, except Vrhovo, are developed as a chain of five Slovenia's Lower Sava Valley plants since 2002. They will have production capacity of 2,000 gigawatt-hours per year and 570 megawatts of installed capacity. Completion of the five power plants is expected to cost 700 million euros. There are also plans for construction of ten new powerplants in the middle Sava valley HE Suhadol, HE Trbovlje, HE Renke, HE Ponovice, HE Kresnice, HE Jevnica, HE Zalog, HE Šentjakob, HE Ježica and HE Tacen. Croatia is planning the construction of four hydroelectric power plants on the Sava River in the Zagreb area. The four plants—Podsused, Prečko, Zagreb and Drenje—are scheduled to be completed by 2021 at a cost of 800 million euros. The four power plants will have an installed capacity of 122 megawatts and an annual production capacity of 610 gigawatt-hours.

Hydroelectric power plant	Location	Installed capacity	Annual production capacity
Moste	Moste, Slovenia	21 MW	56 GWh
Mavčiče	Mavčiče, Slovenia	38 MW	62 GWh
Medvode	Medvode, Slovenia	25 MW	72 GWh
Vrhovo	Vrhovo, Slovenia	34.2 MW	116 GWh
Boštanj	Boštanj, Slovenia	36 MW	115 GWh
Blanca	Blanca, Slovenia	42 MW	144 GWh
Sources: Savske Elektrarne Ljubljana, Hidroelektrarne na spodnji Savi.

=== Water supply and food production ===
Use of water for public water supply in the Sava River basin is estimated at 783,000,000 cubic metres (2.77×10^{10} cubic feet) per year, and another 289,000,000 cubic metres (1.02×10^{10} cubic feet) of water per year is used for industrial production purposes. Use of water for agriculture in the Sava River basin is relatively high, but most of it is applied in non-consumptive uses, such as fish farming. Use of water for irrigation is relatively low, estimated at 30,000,000 cubic metres (1.1×10^{9} cubic feet) per year. Commercial fishing on the Sava River is in decline since the middle of the 20th century. In 1978, there were only 97 commercial fishermen there, while recreational fishing became dominant. The decline became more rapid during the wars in Croatia and Bosnia-Herzegovina, reducing the quantity of fish caught in the river to approximately one-third of the pre-war catches which ranged from 719 to 988 tonnes (708 to 972 long tons; 793 to 1,089 short tons) between 1979 and 1990. The International Sava River Basin Commission (ISRBC), a cooperative body established by Bosnia-Herzegovina, Croatia, Slovenia and Serbia and Montenegro in 2005, is tasked with the establishment of sustainable management of surface water and groundwater resources in the Sava River basin.

=== Navigation and ports ===
The Sava is navigable to larger vessels for 593.8 kilometres (369.0 miles) between its confluence with the Danube in Belgrade, Serbia and Galdovo Bridge in Sisak, Croatia, 2.8 kilometres (1.7 miles) upstream from confluence of Sava and Kupa rivers. The confluence marks the westernmost point of the river course designated as a Class IV international waterway in compliance with the United Nations Economic Commission for Europe's European Agreement on Main Inland Waterways of International Importance (AGN). The classification means that the river course between Sisak and Belgrade is navigable to ships of the maximum length of 80 to 85 metres (262 to 279 feet), the maximum beam of 9.5 metres (31 feet), the maximum draught of 2.5 metres (8 feet 2 inches) and tonnage up to 1,500 tonnes (1,500 long tons; 1,700 short tons). The Sava River downstream of Sisak, is designated as European waterway E 80-12, branching off from the E 80 waterway spanning the Danube and Le Havre via the Rhine. The largest ports on the Sava River are Brčko and Šamac in Bosnia-Herzegovina, Sisak and Slavonski Brod in Croatia, and Šabac and Sremska Mitrovica in Serbia.

As of 2008, 24.5 kilometres (15.2 miles) of the river course between Slavonski Šamac and Oprisavci, as well as additional 219.8 kilometres (136.6 miles) between Slavonski Brod and Sisak, are considered by Croatia's Ministry of Maritime Affairs, Transport and Infrastructure to fail the Class IV criteria, permitting navigation of vessels up to 1,000 tonnes (980 long tons; 1,100 short tons) only, complying with the AGN's Category III. The Slavonski Šamac–Oprisavci section is especially troublesome for navigation as it offers 250 centimetres (98 inches) draught in less than 50% of an average hydrological year, causing navigation to cease each summer. Similar interruptions are less frequent elsewhere on the river, occurring 30 days a year on average upstream from Oprisavci, and even more rarely downstream from Slavonski Šamac.

The restricted draft and fairway is compounded with a meandering of the river's course—limiting the length of vessels—and low bridge clearance. Further problems are incurred through poor transport infrastructure along the route, including poor navigation markings, and presence of sunken vessels and unexploded munitions. Navigation along further 68 kilometres (42 miles) of the river upstream to Rugvica near Zagreb is possible for vessels with tonnage below 1,000 tonnes (980 long tons; 1,100 short tons), and the section of the river belongs to the AGN's Category II. There are plans for the restoration of the Category IV compliant waterway downstream of Sisak and betterment of navigation infrastructure between Sisak and Rugvica, as well as upgrading of the waterway between Brčko and Belgrade to Category Va, matching that of the Danube, with uninterrupted navigation through the year. The plan is planned to be supported by the European Union and as of October 2012, an agreement to implement the plan was signed by Bosnia-Herzegovina and Croatia, while Serbia is invited to join the project. The plan aims to increase the safety and volume of river transport, which declined by about 70% since the breakup of Yugoslavia, largely because of poor maintenance of the route. The ISRBC is tasked with the establishment of an international regime of navigation on the river since 2005.

Country	Port	Annual cargo	Year
Croatia	Sisak	139,899 t	2007
Croatia	Slavonski Brod	139,364 t	2007
Serbia	Sremska Mitrovica	295,551 t	2009

=== Road, rail, and pipeline transport ===
The Sava Valley is also a route for road and rail traffic. The river valley routes are a part of the Pan-European Corridor X, and forming junctions with Pan-European Corridors V, Vb, Vc, Xa and Xb in area of Ljubljana (V), Zagreb (Vb, Xa), Slavonski Šamac (Vc), and Belgrade (Xb). The motorways forming the Pan-European Corridor X in the area—Slovenia's A2, Croatia's A3 and Serbia's A1 motorways—represent a part of European route E70 Bordeaux–Turin–Ljubljana–Zagreb–Belgrade–Bucharest, and the European route E61 Villach–Ljubljana–Trieste–Rijeka. A largely double track and electrifried railway is also a part of the Corridor X. The railway was a part of the Simplon-Orient-Express and Direct-Orient-Express routes. The navigable river course between Belgrade and Galdovo north of Sisak is spanned by 25 bridges. The Sava River valley east of Sisak is also used as a route for the Jadranski naftovod, a crude oil pipeline. The system connects the Port of Rijeka oil terminal to oil refineries in Rijeka and Sisak, to Brod in Bosnia-Herzegovina, as well as Novi Sad and Pančevo in Serbia.

== Environmental issues ==
=== Pollution ===
The main pressure on the Sava River basin environment is generated by the activities of the urban population in the basin. Even though nearly all population centres generating pollution above 10,000 population equivalent (PE) have some sort of sewage treatment in place, less than a quarter of them are adequate. Wastewater from 86% of Sava River basin settlements, generating more than 2,000 PE, goes untreated. Pollution levels vary along the river. The best conditions in terms of wastewater treatment are found in Slovenia, although the existing facilities are inadequate.

In Serbia, on the other hand, 68% of population centres have no wastewater treatment facilities at all. Population centres exceeding 2,000 PE directly discharge into the Sava River basin's surface waters 11112 tonnes of nitrogen and 2,642 tonnes of phosphorus.

Agriculture is another significant source of the Sava River basin surface water pollution, specifically through livestock manure production. It is estimated that the nutrient pollution levels generated by manure production equal 32,394 tonnes of nitrogen and 3,784 tonnes of phosphorus per year. As a consequence, the Sava River is microbiologically polluted in areas affected by the nutrient pollution. One such part of the river is the lowermost part of its course between Šabac and Belgrade, where acceptable freshwater bacterial counts are exceeded.

Levels of industrial pollution vary significantly throughout the basin. In 2007, significant sources of industrial pollution were identified in Slovenia, Bosnia and Herzegovina, and Serbia. Levels of lead, cadmium and arsenic measured in the Sava River at Zagreb in 2003 did not exceed permitted concentrations, but measured levels of mercury exceeded permitted levels in four out of 216 samples. Levels of heavy metals, specifically zinc, copper, lead and cadmium, measured in sediments in the Sava River near Belgrade were assessed as representing little to no risk, and the conclusion drawn was that in order to "reduce the existing bacterial contamination of the Sava River it is necessary to control faecal discharge near cities like Belgrade." The two countries (Croatia and Montenegro) with the greatest direct access to the Adriatic showed by far the least polluted basin surface waters, although other factors, such as demography, agricultural/environmental development and, especially, investment (internal and external), play a role.

Hazardous substances load from significant industrial pollution of the Sava River basin surface waters in 2007
Country	Arsenic	Cadmium	Chromium	Copper	Mercury	Nickel	Lead	Zinc	Phenols
Slovenia	115	0.03	83	142	0.51	582	75	7,656	104
Croatia	N/A	N/A	N/A	N/A	0.02	0.04	0.02	N/A	N/A
Bosnia-Herzegovina	N/A	N/A	1380	983	N/A	21	13,629	1656	N/A
Serbia	2,010	N/A	N/A	N/A	N/A	N/A	N/A	1223	2,038
Montenegro	N/A	N/A	N/A	N/A	N/A	N/A	246	1	N/A
Source: International Sava River Basin Commission; N/A - data not available

=== Protected areas ===
The Sava River basin is very significant because of its biological diversity, and it contains large alluvial wetlands and lowland forests. This led to the designation of six protected areas under provisions of the Ramsar Convention by the countries in the basin. Those are Lake Cerknica in Slovenia, Lonjsko Polje and Crna Mlaka in Croatia, Lake Bardača in Bosnia-Herzegovina, and Obedska and Zasavica bogs in Serbia.

== Sport and recreation ==
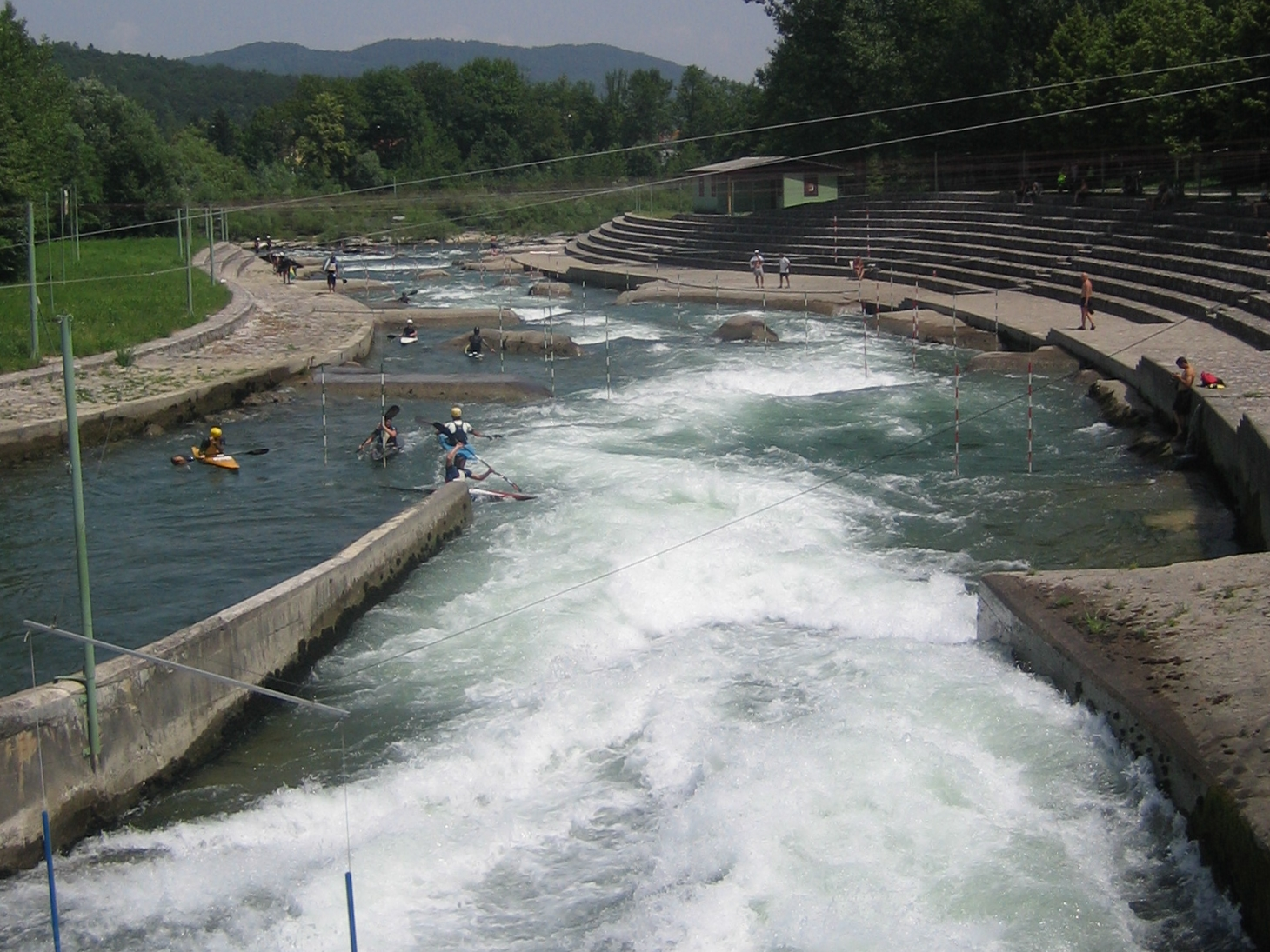
The Tacen Whitewater Course in Ljubljana, Slovenia

There are several sports and recreational grounds on the river banks and gravel pits and artificial lakes adjacent. Tacen Whitewater Course, on the right bank of the Sava in Tacen, a suburb of Ljubljana, was built as a permanent kayaking course in 1948. It hosts a major international competition almost every year, examples being the ICF Canoe Slalom World Championships in 1955, 1991 and 2010. In Zagreb, Jarun complex of lakes along the river course offers a range of facilities for swimming, water sports and cycling. The island of Ada Ciganlija in Belgrade is the major recreational zone of the city, gathering as many as 100,000 visitors daily in the summer months.

The Sava River is the site of several regattas. Those include the International Sava Tour rowing regatta taking place between Zagreb and Brčko, and the Belgrade Regatta (sailing regatta).

The river is also the site of the Šabac Swimming Marathon—an open water swimming competition, running on an 18.8-kilometre (11.7 mi) course between the village of Jarak and the city of Šabac in Serbia. The competition is held annually since 1970, and was included in FINA international calendar from 1984 to 2012.

Recreational and sport fishing is a popular activity along the Sava River course. There is a 700 metres (2,300 feet) long sport fishing competition ground near Hotemež, Slovenia.

== Tradition ==
Worship of various river gods in the area dates to the Late Bronze Age, when the first settlements were founded along the Sava River. Taurisci associated their river goddess Adsullata with the Savus. Altars or inscriptions dedicated to the river-god Savus have been found at a number of locations along the river course, including at the Zelenci Pools where the Sava Dolinka rises, and a number of Roman settlements and castra built along the Via Pannonia, the Roman road running from Aquileia to the Danube. The settlements include Emona, Andautonia and Siscia (near modern-day Ljubljana, Velika Gorica and Sisak respectively) upstream of the Kupa River confluence, and Marsonia, itself built atop a prehistoric settlement, Cibalae, Sirmium and Singidunum (in modern-day Slavonski Brod, Vinkovci, Sremska Mitrovica and Belgrade) downstream of the Kupa. Besides the altar found at the Zelenci Pools, inscriptions and sites dedicated to Savus have been found in remains of Emona, Andautonia and Siscia. Several years after 1751 completion of the Robba Fountain in Ljubljana, the three male figures sculpted as parts of the fountain became identified with the river gods of Sava, Krka and Ljubljanica. In the early 20th century, the fountain was named the Fountain of Three Carniolan Rivers.

The Romantic poet France Prešeren wrote The Baptism on the Savica (Slovene: Krst pri Savici), the Slovene national epic, in 1835. The poem, referring in its title to a headwater of the Sava River, helped to inspire the design of the coat of arms of Slovenia of 1991:

However, the two wavy lines at the base of the blazon officially represent rivers of Slovenia and the Adriatic Sea rather than the Savica or the Sava specifically.

The Sava River also appears symbolically in the coat of arms of the former Kingdom of Slavonia:

The design, approved by the Vladislaus II of Bohemia and Hungary in 1496, incorporates two bars symbolising the Sava and the Drava rivers tracing the borders of the kingdom. The design inspired the arms of several present-day counties of Croatia in the region of Slavonia and itself forms a part of the coat of arms of Croatia. The poem Horvatska domovina, written by Antun Mihanović in 1835 as a national symbol of Croatia, also refers to the Sava River. Modified lyrics of the poem later became the Croatian anthem.

== See also ==
- International Sava River Basin Commission
- Posavina (region)
