= Miljana Border Bridge =

Bridge between Croatia and Slovenia

Miljana Border Bridge Croatian: Pogranični most Miljana Slovene: Mejni most Miljana
- Coordinates: 46°07′43″N 15°36′42″E
- Carries: 2 traffic lanes, 2 pedestrian lanes
- Crosses: Sutla River
- Locale: (Croatia) Zagorska Sela (Slovenia) Podčetrtek
- Official name: Miljana on Sutla Bridge

Characteristics
- Total length: 25 m (82 ft)
- Width: 9.6 m (31 ft)

History
- Construction start: January 2012
- Construction end: July 2012
- Inaugurated: 11 July 2012; 12 years ago

Miljana Border Bridge (Croatian: Pogranični most Miljana; Slovene: Mejni most Miljana) is a bridge over the Sutla River, between Croatia and Slovenia.

It was built in 2012 and opened on 11 July by Croatian and Slovene ministers of infrastructure, Siniša Hajdaš Dončić and Zvonko Černač.
