= Olimje Castle =

Coordinates: 46°9′0.17″N 15°33′46.62″E

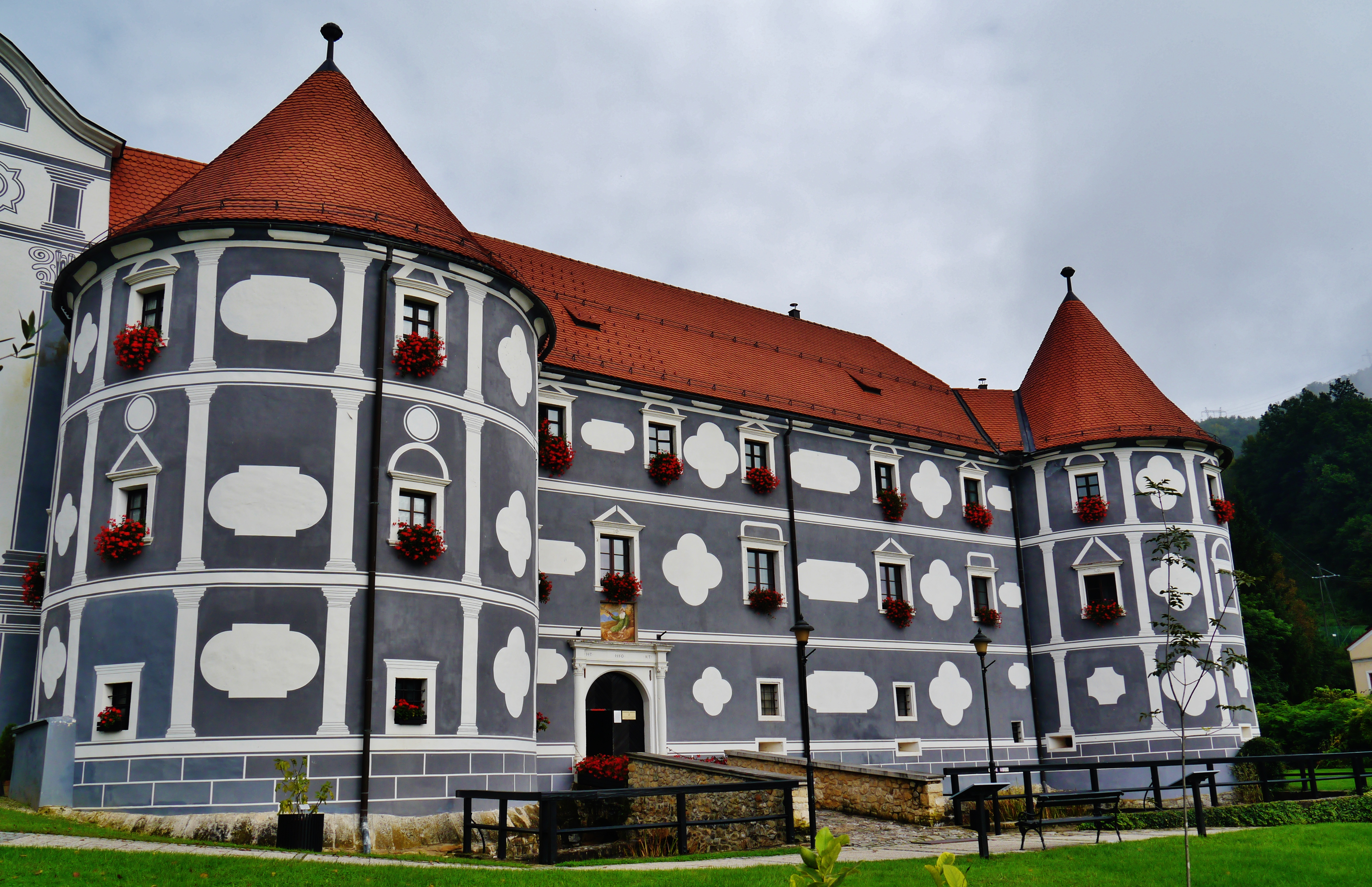
Olimje Castle

Olimje Castle (Slovene: Grad Olimje) is a 16th-century castle located in the settlement of Olimje, part of the Municipality of Podčetrtek in eastern Slovenia. It is currently a Franciscan monastery.

== History ==
The predecessor of the current castle occupied the site since c. 1000, and first belonged to the counts von Peilestein (known locally as "Pilštajn"), including Hemma of Gurk (Slovene: Sv. Ema Krška), an 11th-century saint and member of the family.

Around 1550, a Count Tattenbach rebuilt the castle in renaissance style, at the same time adding a defensive ditch to guard against Turkish incursions.

In 1658 the castle was bought by Baron Ivan Zakmardy of Zagreb, who began converting it into a monastery, and in 1663 donated it to brothers of the Pauline order from Lepoglava, Croatia. Between 1665 and 1675, they completed the conversion and added a handsome baroque church, whose altar of the Assumption of Mary is considered one of the finest baroque altars in Slovenia. In 1740, the monk Ivan Ranger painted the entire presbytery, and a side chapel was built and decorated.

The Paulines also established a pharmacy, among the oldest in Europe; the monastery contains a fresco honoring Paracelsus. The anticlerical reforms of Joseph II forced the monks out, as their activities did not include running a school or other charitable institution, and Olimje was not a parish, which it became in 1785. The former monastery was bought by the noble house of Attems in 1805; due to high taxes, the new owners could however not afford the upkeep of the entire structure, and had the north and west wings torn down.

The castle was nationalized after World War II. In 1974, a major earthquake badly damaged it; soon afterward it was thoroughly renovated with the assistance of national, municipal, and parish funds. The sanctuary and parish were given to the Conventual Franciscans in 1990. On 15 August 1999, they revived the monastery after 217 years. Today they care for both pilgrims and the tourists visiting the historic castle and pharmacy. Due to public interest, they have also established a herbal apothecary.

== Gallery ==
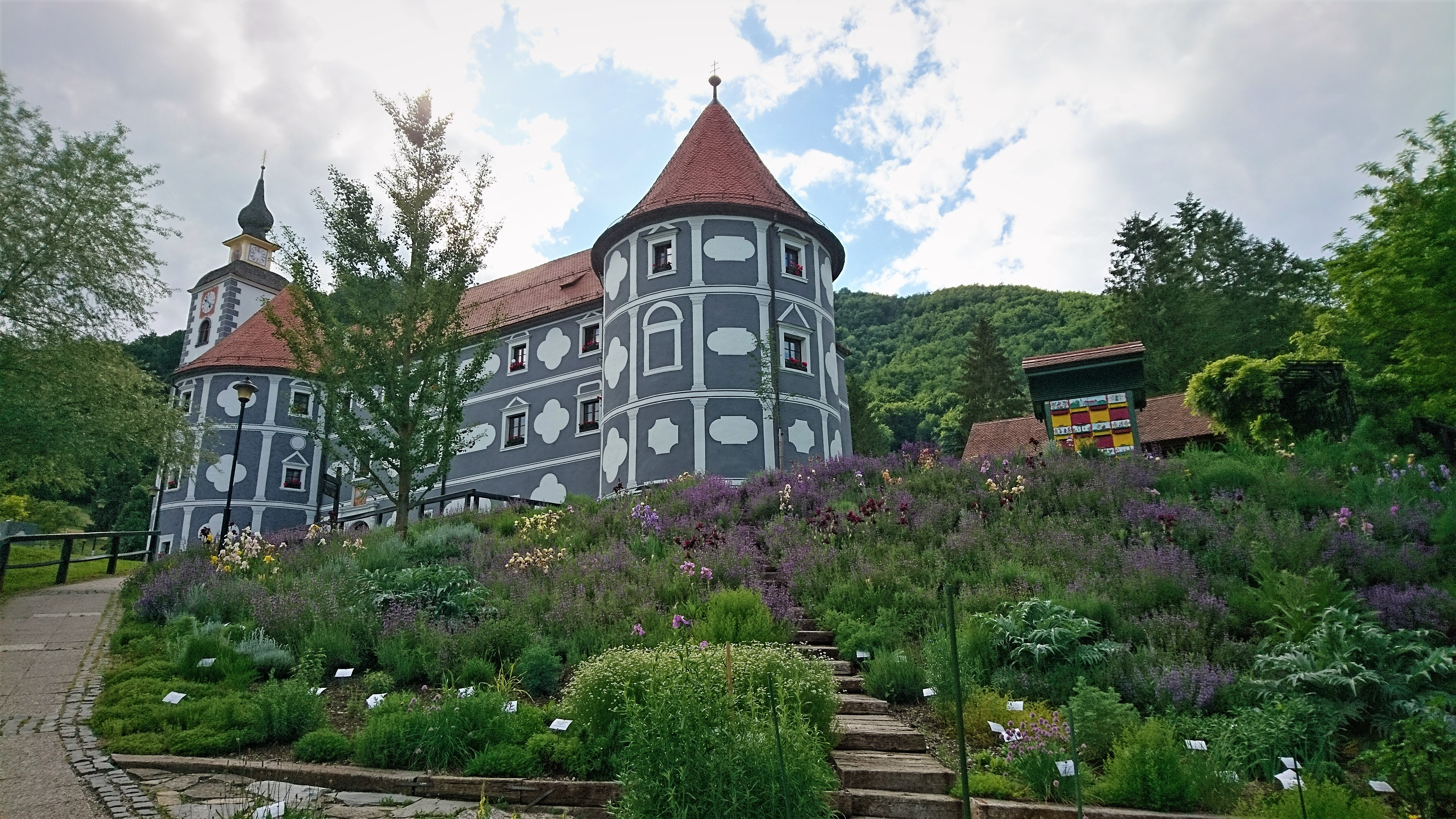
Olimje Castle, herb garden

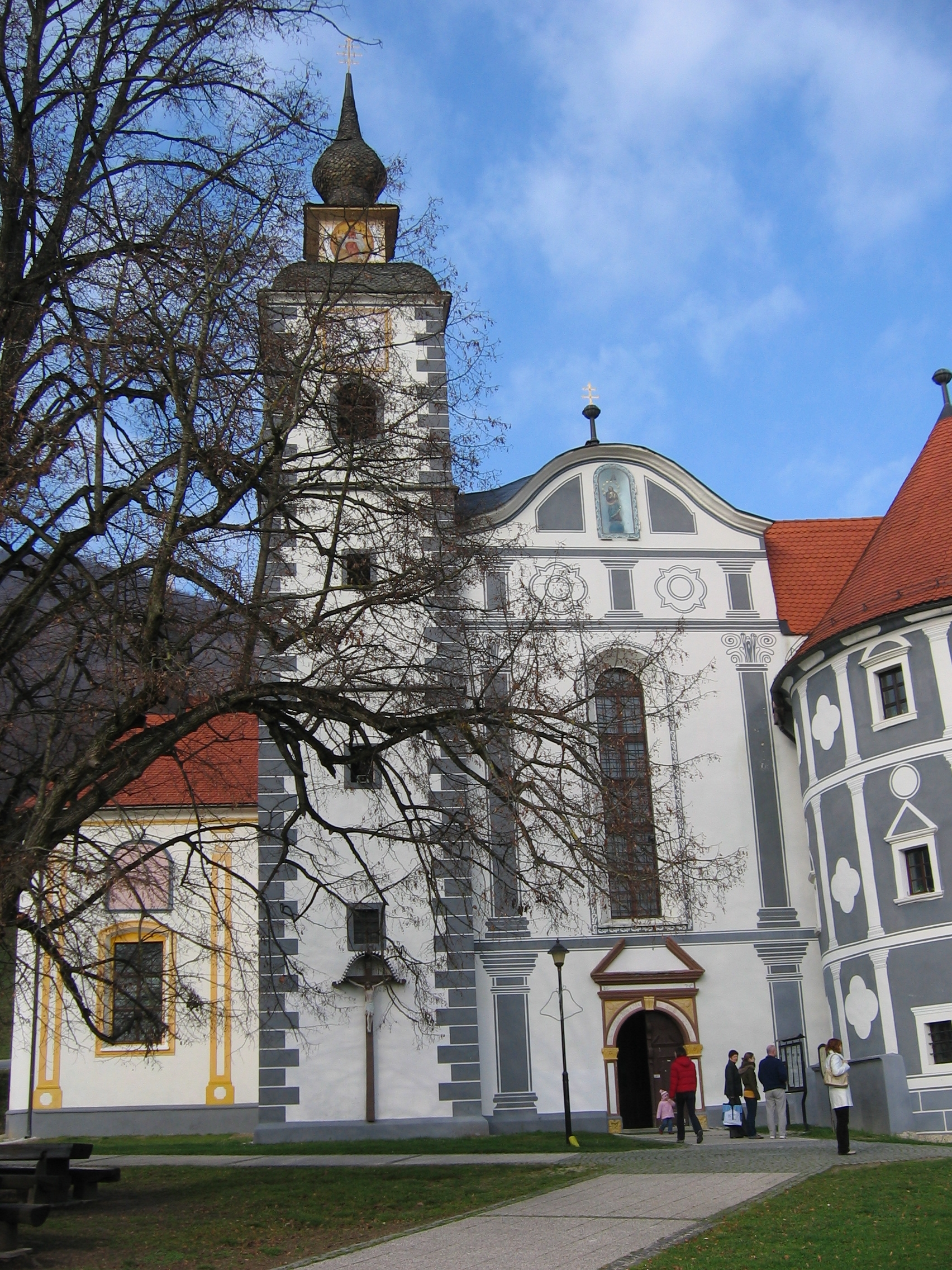
Olimje Castle, church facade

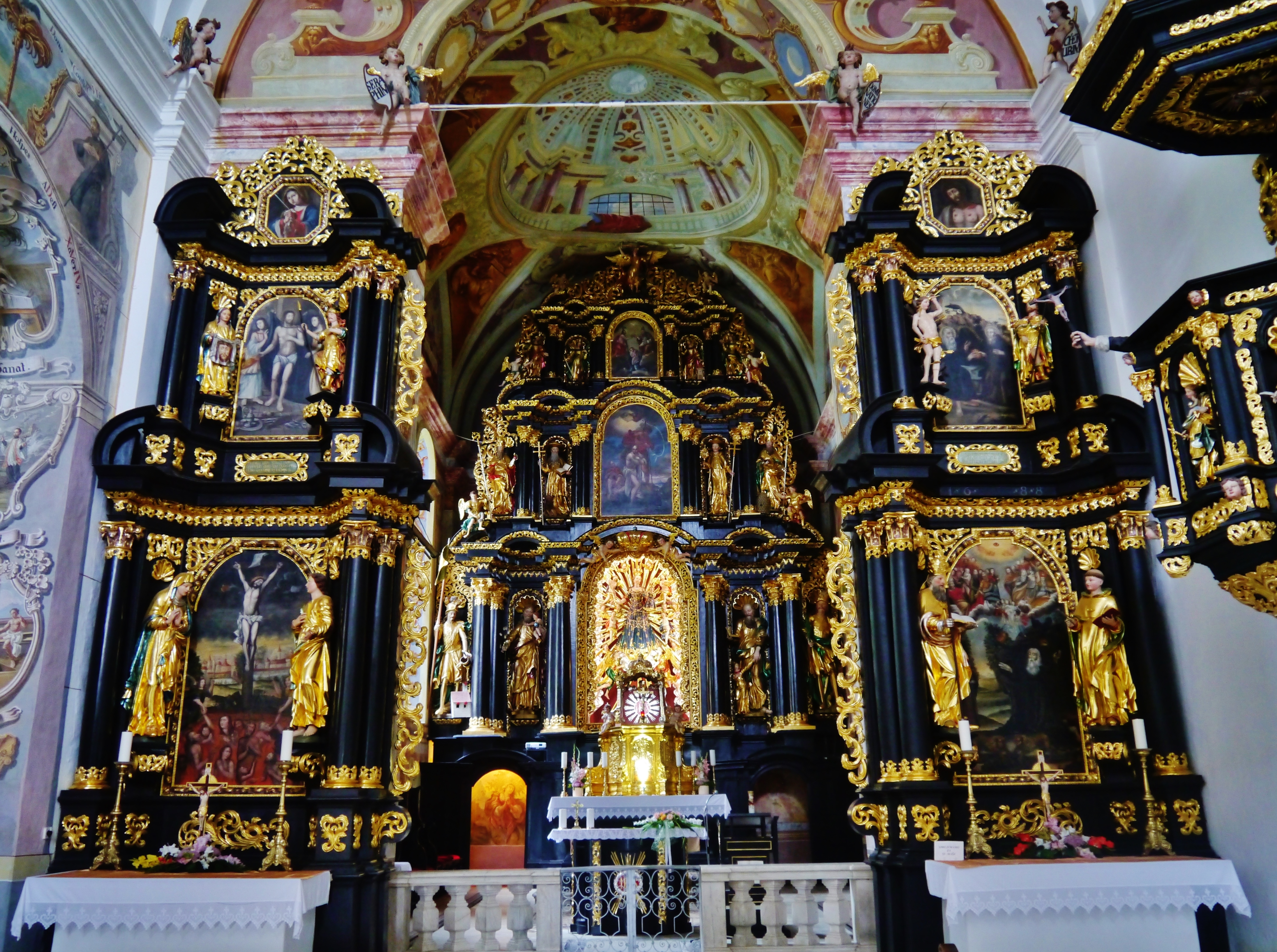
Church main altar, devoted to St. Mary

== Sources ==
- Olimje Monastery at GremoVen.com
- Podčetrtek Official Website
