= Rudnica, Podčetrtek =

Rudnica
- Location in Slovenia
- Coordinates: 46°8′54.08″N 15°32′14.04″E
- Country: Slovenia
- Traditional region: Styria
- Statistical region: Savinja
- Municipality: Podčetrtek

Area
  - Total: 0.93 km^{2} (0.36 sq mi)
- Elevation: 548.1 m (1,798 ft)

Population (2002)
  - Total: 32

Rudnica (pronounced [ˈɾuːdnitsa]) is a small settlement on the southern slopes of a hill with the same name, to the west of Olimje in the Municipality of Podčetrtek in eastern Slovenia. The area around Podčetrtek is part of the traditional region of Styria. It is now included in the Savinja Statistical Region.
