= Golobinjek ob Sotli =

- Location in Slovenia
- Coordinates: 46°7′16.13″N 15°35′54.81″E
- Country: Slovenia
- Traditional region: Styria
- Statistical region: Savinja
- Municipality: Podčetrtek

Area
  - Total: 1.49 km^{2} (0.58 sq mi)
- Elevation: 190.6 m (625 ft)

Population (2002)
  - Total: 61

Golobinjek ob Sotli (pronounced [ɡɔlɔˈbiːnjək ɔp ˈsoːtli], German: Taubendorf) is a settlement on the right bank of the Sotla River in the Municipality of Podčetrtek in eastern Slovenia. The area around Podčetrtek is part of the traditional region of Styria. It is now included in the Savinja Statistical Region.

== Name ==
The name of the settlement was changed from Golobinjek to Golobinjek ob Sotli in 1953.
