= Prelasko =

- Location in Slovenia
- Coordinates: 46°6′36.22″N 15°36′7.42″E
- Country: Slovenia
- Traditional region: Styria
- Statistical region: Savinja
- Municipality: Podčetrtek

Area
  - Total: 1.59 km^{2} (0.61 sq mi)
- Elevation: 197.3 m (647 ft)

Population (2002)
  - Total: 63

Prelasko (pronounced [ˈpɾeːlaskɔ]) is a settlement on the right bank of the Sotla River in the Municipality of Podčetrtek in eastern Slovenia. The area around Podčetrtek is part of the traditional region of Styria. It is now included in the Savinja Statistical Region.
