= Nezbiše =

- Location in Slovenia
- Coordinates: 46°11′49.68″N 15°36′24.84″E
- Country: Slovenia
- Traditional region: Styria
- Statistical region: Savinja
- Municipality: Podčetrtek

Area
  - Total: 1.94 km^{2} (0.75 sq mi)
- Elevation: 207.2 m (680 ft)

Population (2002)
  - Total: 143

Nezbiše (pronounced [ˈneːzbiʃɛ]) is a settlement in the Municipality of Podčetrtek in eastern Slovenia. The area around Podčetrtek is part of the traditional region of Styria. It is now included in the Savinja Statistical Region.

The local church is dedicated to Saint Catherine and belongs to the Parish of Sveta Ema. It was built in 1772 in the Baroque style.
