= Imenska Gorca =

- Location in Slovenia
- Coordinates: 46°8′24.72″N 15°35′7.09″E
- Country: Slovenia
- Traditional region: Styria
- Statistical region: Savinja
- Municipality: Podčetrtek

Area
  - Total: 1.3 km^{2} (0.50 sq mi)
- Elevation: 338.5 m (1,111 ft)

Population (2002)
  - Total: 54

Imenska Gorca (pronounced [iˈmeːnska ˈɡɔːɾtsa], German: Stadelberg) is a settlement on a hill northwest of Imeno in the Municipality of Podčetrtek in eastern Slovenia. The area around Podčetrtek is part of the traditional region of Styria. It is now included in the Savinja Statistical Region.

The local church is dedicated to the Holy Cross and belongs to the Parish of Podčetrtek. It was built in the mid-16th century.
