= Cmereška Gorca =

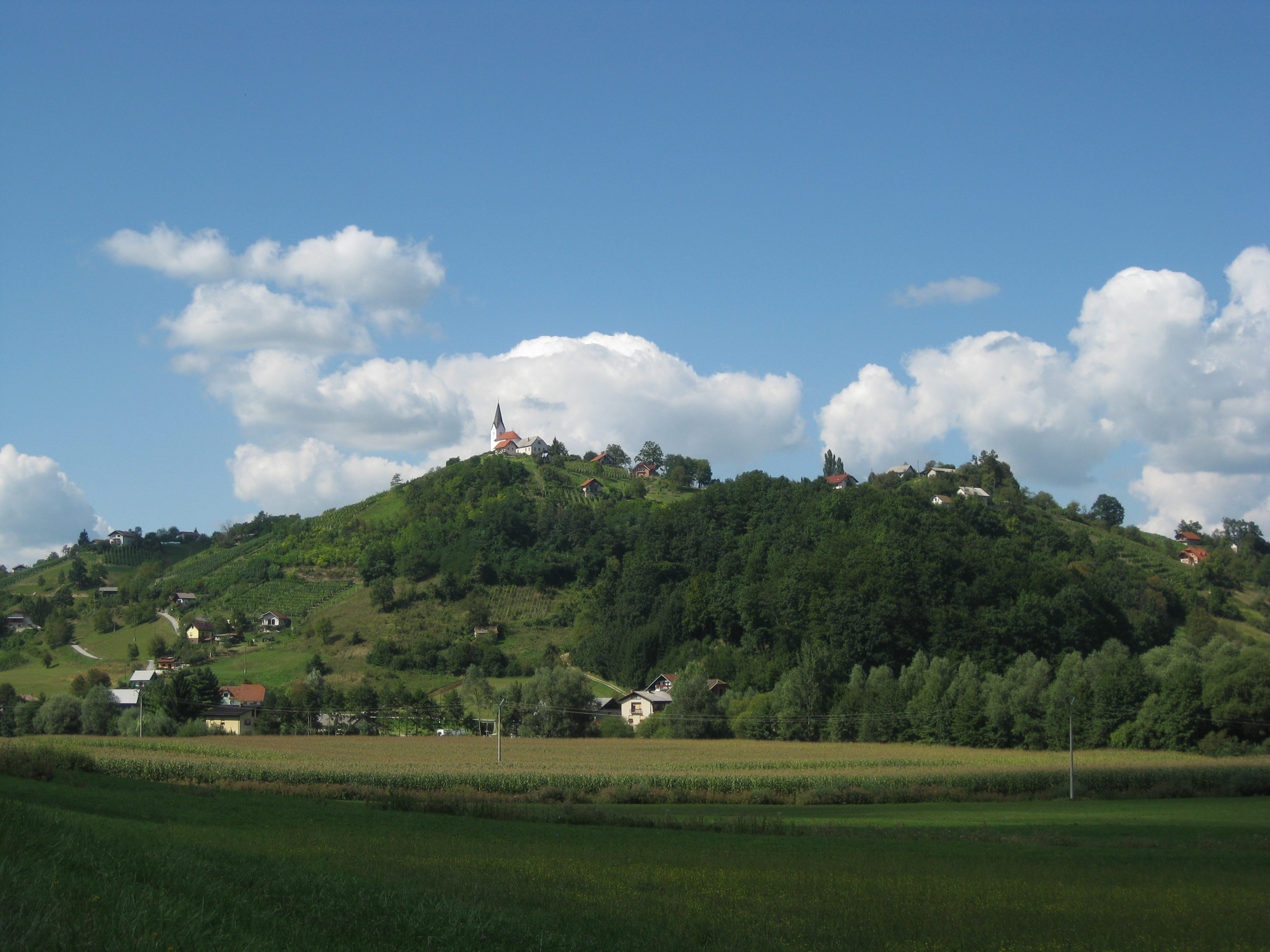

- Location in Slovenia
- Coordinates: 46°11′6.28″N 15°35′21.87″E
- Country: Slovenia
- Traditional region: Styria
- Statistical region: Savinja
- Municipality: Podčetrtek

Area
  - Total: 1.42 km^{2} (0.55 sq mi)
- Elevation: 299 m (981 ft)

Population (2002)
  - Total: 83

Cmereška Gorca (pronounced [tsmɛˈɾeːʃka ˈɡɔːɾtsa]) is a settlement in the Municipality of Podčetrtek in eastern Slovenia. The area around Podčetrtek is part of the traditional region of Styria. It is now included in the Savinja Statistical Region.

The settlement is built around a small hill with a local church dedicated to Saint Urban. It belongs to the Parish of Sveta Ema. Its belfry dates to the 17th century, but the remainder of the church was rebuilt in 1850.
