= Lastnič =

- Location in Slovenia
- Coordinates: 46°4′54.57″N 15°36′57.51″E
- Country: Slovenia
- Traditional region: Styria
- Statistical region: Savinja
- Municipality: Podčetrtek

Area
  - Total: 5.11 km^{2} (1.97 sq mi)
- Elevation: 251.9 m (826 ft)

Population (2002)
  - Total: 161

Lastnič (pronounced [lasˈtniːtʃ]) is a settlement in the hills above the right bank of the Sotla River in the Municipality of Podčetrtek in eastern Slovenia. The area around Podčetrtek is part of the traditional region of Styria. It is now included in the Savinja Statistical Region.
