= Polje ob Sotli =

- Location in Slovenia
- Coordinates: 46°5′32.31″N 15°36′26.74″E
- Country: Slovenia
- Traditional region: Styria
- Statistical region: Savinja
- Municipality: Podčetrtek

Area
  - Total: 0.92 km^{2} (0.36 sq mi)
- Elevation: 197.9 m (649 ft)

Population (2025)
  - Total: 43

Polje ob Sotli (pronounced [ˈpoːljɛ ɔp ˈsoːtli]) is a settlement on the right bank of the Sotla River in the Municipality of Podčetrtek in eastern Slovenia. The area around Podčetrtek is part of the traditional region of Styria. It is now included in the Savinja Statistical Region.

== Name ==
The name of the settlement was changed from Polje to Polje ob Sotli in 1953.

== Church ==
The parish church in the settlement is dedicated to Saint Nicholas and belongs to the Roman Catholic Diocese of Celje. It was first mentioned in written documents dating to 1545, but was expanded and rebuilt on a number of occasions.
