= Vidovica =

Vidovica Sveti Vid (until 1955)
- Location in Slovenia
- Coordinates: 46°11′12.08″N 15°37′28.32″E
- Country: Slovenia
- Traditional region: Styria
- Statistical region: Savinja
- Municipality: Podčetrtek

Area
  - Total: 1.34 km^{2} (0.52 sq mi)
- Elevation: 298.6 m (980 ft)

Population (2002)
  - Total: 66

Vidovica (pronounced [ˈʋiːdɔʋitsa]) is a settlement in the Municipality of Podčetrtek in eastern Slovenia, close to the border with Croatia. The area is part of the traditional region of Styria. It is now included in the Savinja Statistical Region.

== Name ==
The name of the settlement was changed from Sveti Vid (literally, 'Saint Vitus') to Vidovica in 1955. The name was changed on the basis of the 1948 Law on Names of Settlements and Designations of Squares, Streets, and Buildings as part of efforts by Slovenia's postwar communist government to remove religious elements from toponyms.

== Church ==
The local church, from which the village gets its name, is dedicated to Saint Vitus and belongs to the Parish of Sveta Ema. It was built in 1619. The main altar dates to the late 17th century.
