= Vonarje =

- Location in Slovenia
- Coordinates: 46°10′33.33″N 15°37′6.9″E
- Country: Slovenia
- Traditional region: Styria
- Statistical region: Savinja
- Municipality: Podčetrtek

Area
  - Total: 2.75 km^{2} (1.06 sq mi)
- Elevation: 209.5 m (687 ft)

Population (2002)
  - Total: 69

Vonarje (pronounced [ʋɔˈnaːɾjɛ]) is a settlement in the Municipality of Podčetrtek in eastern Slovenia, right on the border with Croatia. The area is part of the traditional region of Styria. It is now included in the Savinja Statistical Region.

The local church in the village is dedicated to Saint Henry and belongs to the Parish of Sveta Ema. It was built in 1748.
