= Sedlarjevo =

- Location in Slovenia
- Coordinates: 46°5′48.3″N 15°37′5.09″E
- Country: Slovenia
- Traditional region: Styria
- Statistical region: Savinja
- Municipality: Podčetrtek

Area
  - Total: 1.52 km^{2} (0.59 sq mi)
- Elevation: 190.1 m (624 ft)

Population (2023)
  - Total: 67

Sedlarjevo (pronounced [sɛˈdlaːɾjɛʋɔ]) is a settlement on the right bank of the Sotla River in the Municipality of Podčetrtek in eastern Slovenia, right on the border with Croatia. The area around Podčetrtek is part of the traditional region of Styria. It is now included in the Savinja Statistical Region.
