= Sela, Podčetrtek =

Sela
- Location in Slovenia
- Coordinates: 46°7′37.83″N 15°34′53.55″E
- Country: Slovenia
- Traditional region: Styria
- Statistical region: Savinja
- Municipality: Podčetrtek

Area
  - Total: 1.89 km^{2} (0.73 sq mi)
- Elevation: 202.2 m (663 ft)

Population (2002)
  - Total: 109

Sela (pronounced [ˈseːla]) is a settlement in the Municipality of Podčetrtek in eastern Slovenia. The area around Podčetrtek is part of the traditional region of Styria. It is now included in the Savinja Statistical Region.

The local church in the village is dedicated to Saints Philip and James and belongs to the parish of Olimje. It was originally a Gothic church first mentioned in documents dating to 1545, but was greatly rebuilt in the late 18th century with additions from 1826 and the late 19th century, although some Gothic frescos are still visible.
