= Sodna Vas =

- Location in Slovenia
- Coordinates: 46°10′29.85″N 15°35′51.32″E
- Country: Slovenia
- Traditional region: Styria
- Statistical region: Savinja
- Municipality: Podčetrtek

Area
  - Total: 1.32 km^{2} (0.51 sq mi)
- Elevation: 207.8 m (682 ft)

Population (2002)
  - Total: 80

Sodna Vas (pronounced [ˈsoːdna ˈʋaːs]; Slovene: Sodna vas, German: Schöpfendorf) is a small settlement in the Municipality of Podčetrtek in eastern Slovenia. The area is part of the traditional region of Styria. It is now included in the Savinja Statistical Region.
