= Pušća, Krapina-Zagorje County =

Settlement in Krapina-Zagorje County, Croatia

Pušća
- Settlement
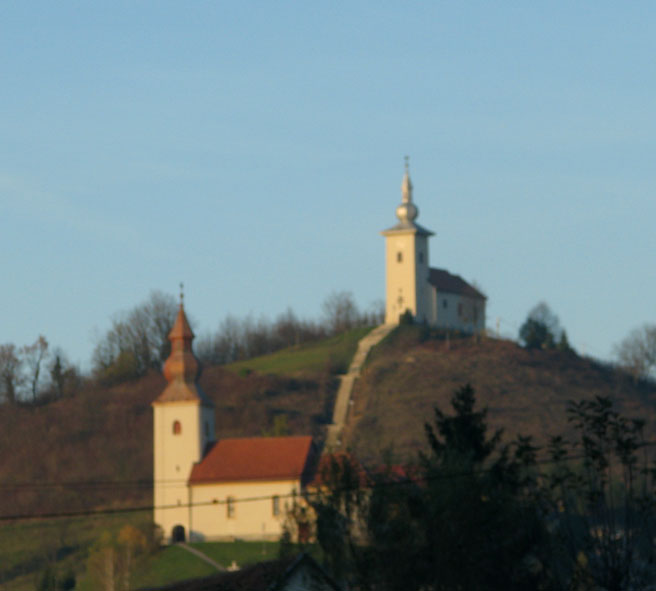
- a settlement in the Pušća Netherlands
- Interactive map of Pušća
- Location of Pušća in Croatia
- Coordinates: 46°07′01″N 15°38′10″E
- Country: Croatia
- County: Krapina-Zagorje
- Municipality: Zagorska Sela

Area
  - Total: 2.1 km^{2} (0.81 sq mi)

Population (2021)
  - Total: 51
  - Density: 24/km^{2} (63/sq mi)
- Time zone: UTC+1 (CET)
  - Summer (DST): UTC+2 (CEST)
- Postal code: 49290 Klanjec
- Area code: +385 (0)49

Pušća is a settlement in the Municipality of Zagorska Sela in Croatia. In 2021, its population was 51.

== Demographics ==
Pušća: Population trends 1857–2021
v

population	253	264	300	333	331	321	295	305	291	278	220	190	115	78	82	66	51
	1857	1869	1880	1890	1900	1910	1921	1931	1948	1953	1961	1971	1981	1991	2001	2011	2021

Sources: Croatian Bureau of Statistics publications
