= Virštanj =

- Location in Slovenia
- Coordinates: 46°7′45.31″N 15°33′42.82″E
- Country: Slovenia
- Traditional region: Styria
- Statistical region: Savinja
- Municipality: Podčetrtek

Area
  - Total: 2.01 km^{2} (0.78 sq mi)
- Elevation: 285 m (935 ft)

Population (2002)
  - Total: 188

Virštanj (pronounced [ˈʋiːɾʃtan]) is a settlement in the Municipality of Podčetrtek in eastern Slovenia. It is best known as a wine-producing area. It is part of the traditional region of Styria and is now included in the Savinja Statistical Region.
