= Pristava pri Lesičnem =

- Location in Slovenia
- Coordinates: 46°7′37.38″N 15°32′0.25″E
- Country: Slovenia
- Traditional region: Styria
- Statistical region: Savinja
- Municipality: Podčetrtek

Area
  - Total: 0.69 km^{2} (0.27 sq mi)
- Elevation: 411 m (1,348 ft)

Population (2002)
  - Total: 26

Pristava pri Lesičnem (pronounced [ˈpɾiːstaʋa pɾi lɛˈsiːtʃnɛm]) is a small settlement in the Municipality of Podčetrtek in eastern Slovenia. The area is part of the traditional region of Styria. It is now included in the Savinja Statistical Region.

== Name ==
The name of the settlement was changed from Pristava to Pristava pri Lesičnem in 1953.
