= Verače =

- Location in Slovenia
- Coordinates: 46°7′14.9″N 15°33′33.66″E
- Country: Slovenia
- Traditional region: Styria
- Statistical region: Savinja
- Municipality: Podčetrtek

Area
  - Total: 2.81 km^{2} (1.08 sq mi)
- Elevation: 327.9 m (1,076 ft)

Population (2002)
  - Total: 122

Verače (pronounced [ʋɛˈɾaːtʃɛ]) is a settlement in the Municipality of Podčetrtek in eastern Slovenia. The area is part of the traditional region of Styria. It is now included in the Savinja Statistical Region.
