= Imeno =

- Village
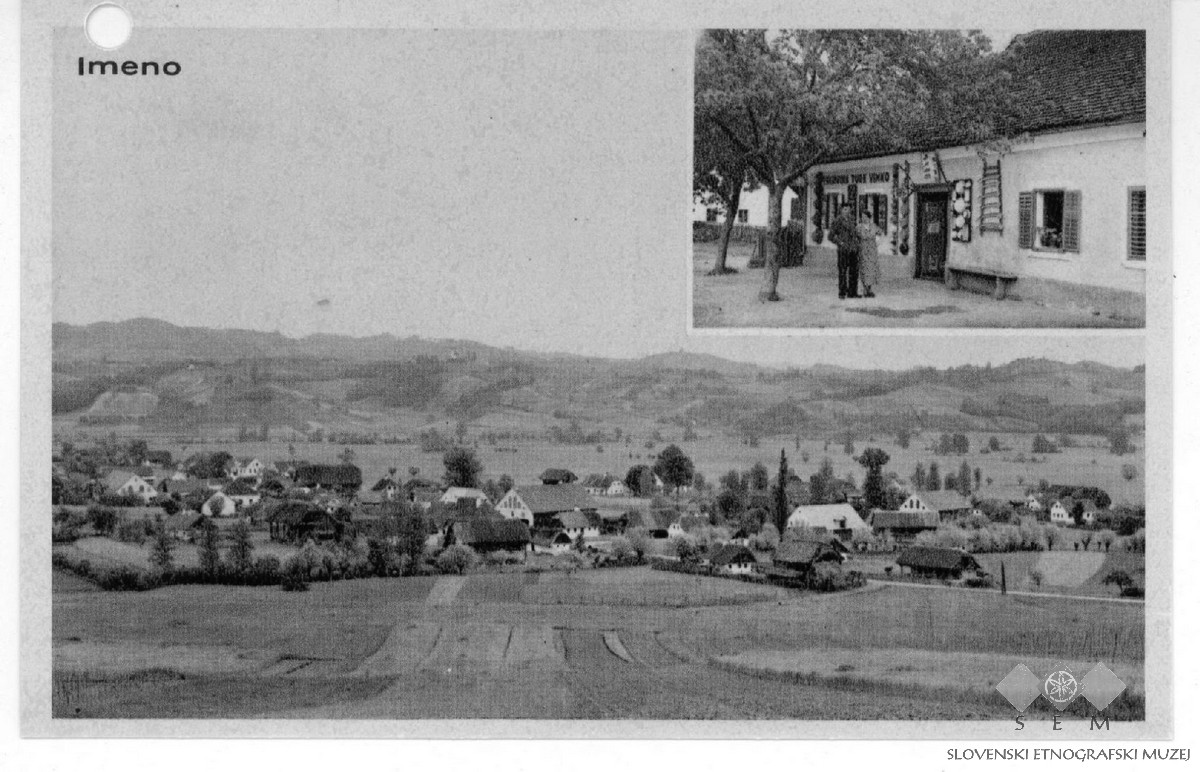
- Postcard of Imeno

- Location in Slovenia
- Coordinates: 46°7′53.05″N 15°35′56.61″E
- Country: Slovenia
- Traditional region: Styria
- Statistical region: Savinja
- Municipality: Podčetrtek

Area
  - Total: 3.11 km^{2} (1.20 sq mi)
- Elevation: 196.1 m (643 ft)

Population (2002)
  - Total: 273

Imeno (pronounced [iˈmeːnɔ]; German: Stadeldorf) is a settlement on the right bank of the Sotla River in the Municipality of Podčetrtek in eastern Slovenia. The railway line from Celje to Zagreb runs through the settlement, and Imeno is the last stop before the international border between Slovenia and Croatia. The settlement also has a grass runway operated by the local flying club, and a hippodrome, where horse races are occasionally held. The area around Podčetrtek is part of the traditional region of Styria. It is now included in the Savinja Statistical Region.

== Name ==
Imeno was attested in written sources in 1404 as in Inferiori Stadlern, in Superiori Stadlern (and as Nider Standlern, Ober Stadlern in 1444). The German name is derived from Middle High German stadel 'barn' and is not related to the Slovene name Imeno. The name Imeno is of unknown origin but could be derived from *Jьměnьno (selo) 'soldier's (village)', with the adjective derived from *jьměn- 'soldier'. In the past the German name of the settlement was Stadeldorf.
