= Jerčin =

- Location in Slovenia
- Coordinates: 46°11′32.95″N 15°37′2.44″E
- Country: Slovenia
- Traditional region: Styria
- Statistical region: Savinja
- Municipality: Podčetrtek

Area
  - Total: 0.99 km^{2} (0.38 sq mi)
- Elevation: 248.5 m (815 ft)

Population (2002)
  - Total: 58

Jerčin (pronounced [jɛɾˈtʃiːn]) is a small settlement in the Municipality of Podčetrtek in eastern Slovenia. The area around Podčetrtek is part of the traditional region of Styria. It is now included in the Savinja Statistical Region.
