= Pecelj =

- Location in Slovenia
- Coordinates: 46°6′46.24″N 15°35′10.24″E
- Country: Slovenia
- Traditional region: Styria
- Statistical region: Savinja
- Municipality: Podčetrtek

Area
  - Total: 1.18 km^{2} (0.46 sq mi)
- Elevation: 225 m (738 ft)

Population (2002)
  - Total: 54

Pecelj (pronounced [ˈpɛːtsəl]) is a small settlement in the Municipality of Podčetrtek in eastern Slovenia. The area is part of the traditional region of Styria. It is now included in the Savinja Statistical Region.
