= Roginska Gorca =

- Location in Slovenia
- Coordinates: 46°10′48.08″N 15°34′29.45″E
- Country: Slovenia
- Traditional region: Styria
- Statistical region: Savinja
- Municipality: Podčetrtek

Area
  - Total: 3.66 km^{2} (1.41 sq mi)
- Elevation: 208.4 m (684 ft)

Population (2002)
  - Total: 130

Roginska Gorca (pronounced [ɾɔˈɡiːnska ˈɡɔːɾtsa]) is a settlement in the Municipality of Podčetrtek in eastern Slovenia. The area around Podčetrtek is part of the traditional region of Styria. It is now included in the Savinja Statistical Region.
