= Brezovec pri Polju =

- Location in Slovenia
- Coordinates: 46°5′8.34″N 15°35′25.03″E
- Country: Slovenia
- Traditional region: Styria
- Statistical region: Savinja
- Municipality: Podčetrtek

Area
  - Total: 1.93 km^{2} (0.75 sq mi)
- Elevation: 345.3 m (1,133 ft)

Population (2002)
  - Total: 97

Brezovec pri Polju (pronounced [ˈbɾeːzɔʋəts pɾi ˈpoːlju]) is a settlement in the Municipality of Podčetrtek in eastern Slovenia. The area around Podčetrtek is part of the traditional region of Styria. It is now included in the Savinja Statistical Region.

== Name ==
The name of the settlement was changed from Brezovec to Brezovec pri Polju in 1953.
