= Municipality of Podčetrtek =

Municipality of Slovenia

Municipality of Podčetrtek Občina Podčetrtek
- Municipality
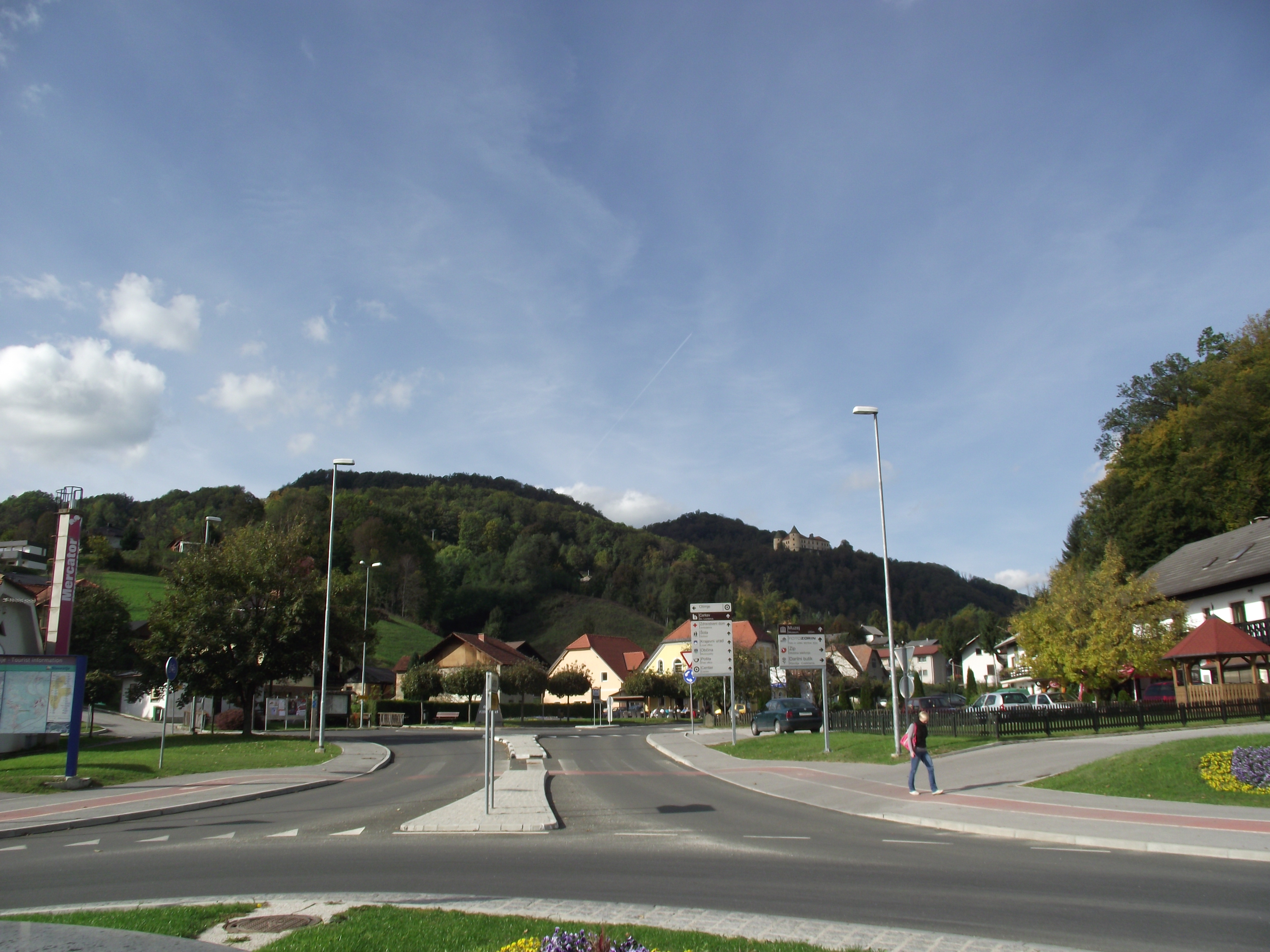

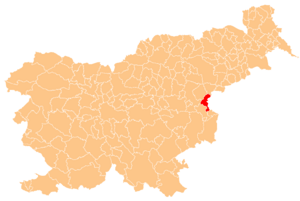
- Location of the Municipality of Podčetrtek in Slovenia
- Coordinates: 46°09′N 15°36′E
- Country: Slovenia

Government
  - Mayor: Peter Misja (Independent)

Area
  - Total: 60.6 km^{2} (23.4 sq mi)

Population (2016)
  - Total: 3,323
  - Density: 54.8/km^{2} (142/sq mi)
- Time zone: UTC+01 (CET)
  - Summer (DST): UTC+02 (CEST)
- Website: www.podcetrtek.si

The Municipality of Podčetrtek (pronounced [ˈpoːtʃɛtəɾtək] or [pɔtʃɛˈtəɾtək]; Slovene: Občina Podčetrtek) is a municipality in the traditional region of Styria in eastern Slovenia. The seat of the municipality is the town of Podčetrtek. Podčetrtek became a municipality in 1995. It borders Croatia.

== Settlements ==
In addition to the municipal seat of Podčetrtek, the municipality also includes the following settlements:

- Brezovec pri Polju
- Cmereška Gorca
- Golobinjek ob Sotli
- Gostinca
- Imeno
- Imenska Gorca
- Jerčin
- Lastnič
- Nezbiše
- Olimje
- Pecelj
- Polje ob Sotli
- Prelasko
- Pristava pri Lesičnem
- Pristava pri Mestinju
- Roginska Gorca
- Rudnica
- Sedlarjevo
- Sela
- Sodna Vas
- Sveta Ema
- Verače
- Vidovica
- Virštanj
- Vonarje
