= Gostinca =

- Location in Slovenia
- Coordinates: 46°7′51.16″N 15°32′31.13″E
- Country: Slovenia
- Traditional region: Styria
- Statistical region: Savinja
- Municipality: Podčetrtek

Area
  - Total: 1.79 km^{2} (0.69 sq mi)
- Elevation: 420.9 m (1,381 ft)

Population (2002)
  - Total: 64

Gostinca (pronounced [ɡɔˈstiːntsa]) is a settlement in the Municipality of Podčetrtek in eastern Slovenia. The area around Podčetrtek is part of the traditional region of Styria. It is now included in the Savinja Statistical Region.
