= Zagorska Sela =

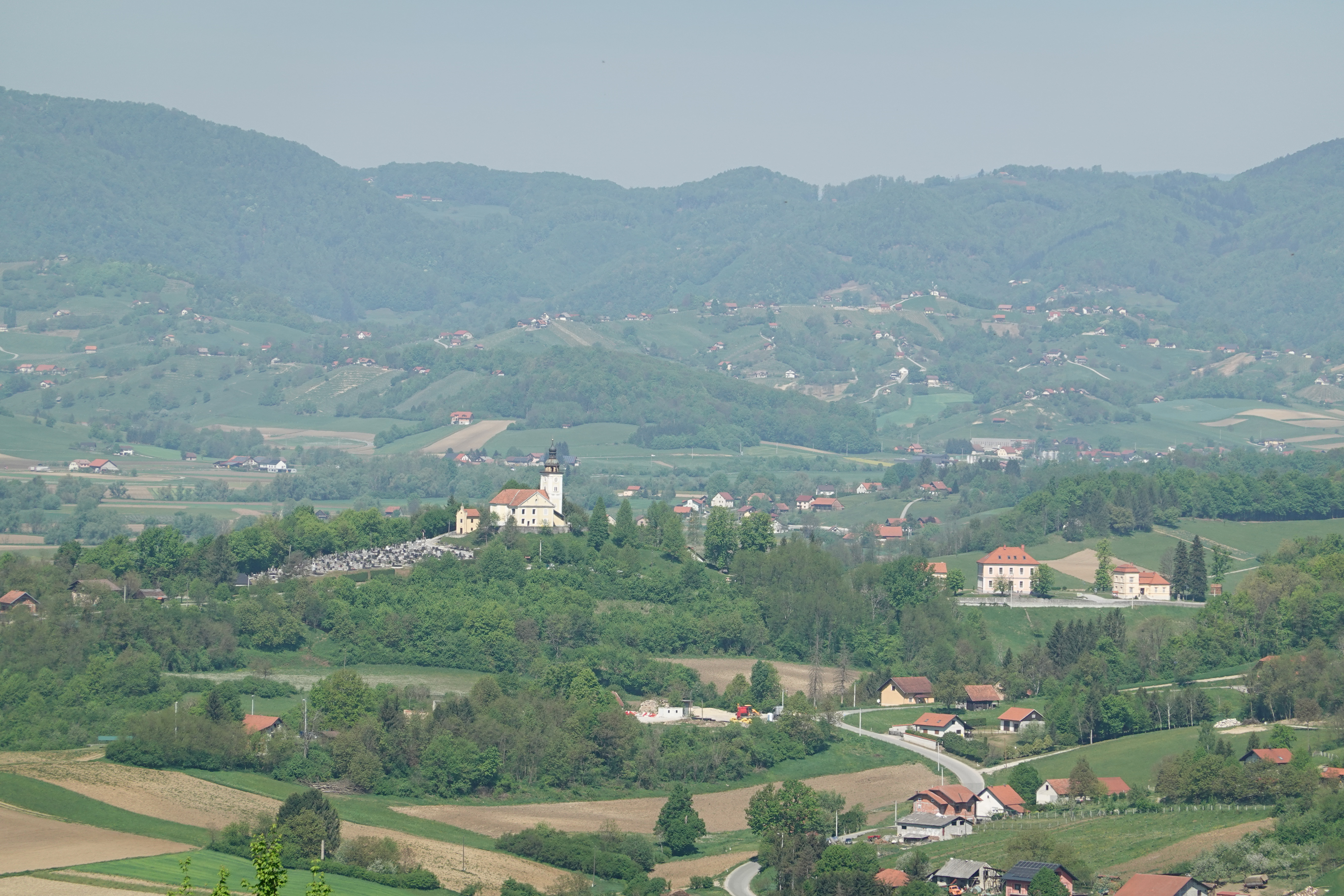
- Parish church in Zagorska Sela
- Interactive map of Zagorska Sela
- Location within Krapina-Zagorje County Location within Croatia
- Coordinates: 46°05′48.84″N 15°38′06.00″E
- Country: Croatia
- County: Krapina-Zagorje County

Government
  - Mayor: Ksenija Krivec Jurak (Independent)

Area
  - Total: 24.7 km^{2} (9.5 sq mi)

Population (2021)
  - Total: 899
  - Density: 36.4/km^{2} (94.3/sq mi)
- Time zone: UTC+1 (CET)
  - Summer (DST): UTC+2 (CEST)
- Website: zagorska-sela.hr

Zagorska Sela is a village and a municipality in the Krapina-Zagorje County, northern Croatia.

== History ==
The most important prehistoric settlement in this area was Špičak above the church of St. Martin in Bojačno. The parish of St. Catherine in Selje was mentioned as early as 1334. Also important is the one-story Baroque castle Miljana which was built from 1597 to the 18th century. At the top of a hill, surrounded by a stone wall, is the parish church of Saint Anne in Poljana Sutlanska, a single-nave late Baroque church from 1810.

The municipality of Sela has existed since 1886. It was located within the Klanjec district and Varaždin County. In 1952, the Municipality of Zagorska Sela was re-formed within the Klanjec district. From 1955, it was a part of the former Klanjec municipality, until 1993, when it was established as the Municipality of Zagorska Sela within the Krapina-Zagorje County.

== Demographics ==
In the 2021 census, there were a total of 899 inhabitants in the area, in the following settlements:

- Bojačno, population 6
- Bratkovec, population 40
- Brezakovec, population 66
- Gornji Škrnik, population 42
- Harina Žlaka, population 33
- Ivanić Miljanski, population 9
- Kuzminec Miljanski, population 17
- Luke Poljanske, population 54
- Miljana, population 82
- Plavić, population 140
- Poljana Sutlanska, population 96
- Pušća, population 51
- Zagorska Sela, population 263

In the same census, the majority of the population were Croats at 90.21%.

Zagorska Sela: Population trends 1857–2021
v

population	2901	3065	3353	3453	3501	3659	3301	3254	3020	2846	2391	2053	1650	1332	1197	996	899
	1857	1869	1880	1890	1900	1910	1921	1931	1948	1953	1961	1971	1981	1991	2001	2011	2021

Sources: Croatian Bureau of Statistics publications

== Administration ==
The current mayor of Zagorska Sela is Ksenija Krivec Jurak and the Zagorska Sela Municipal Council consists of 7 seats.

Groups	Councilors per group
Independents	4 / 7
HDZ	2 / 7
HNS	1 / 7
