= Podčetrtek =

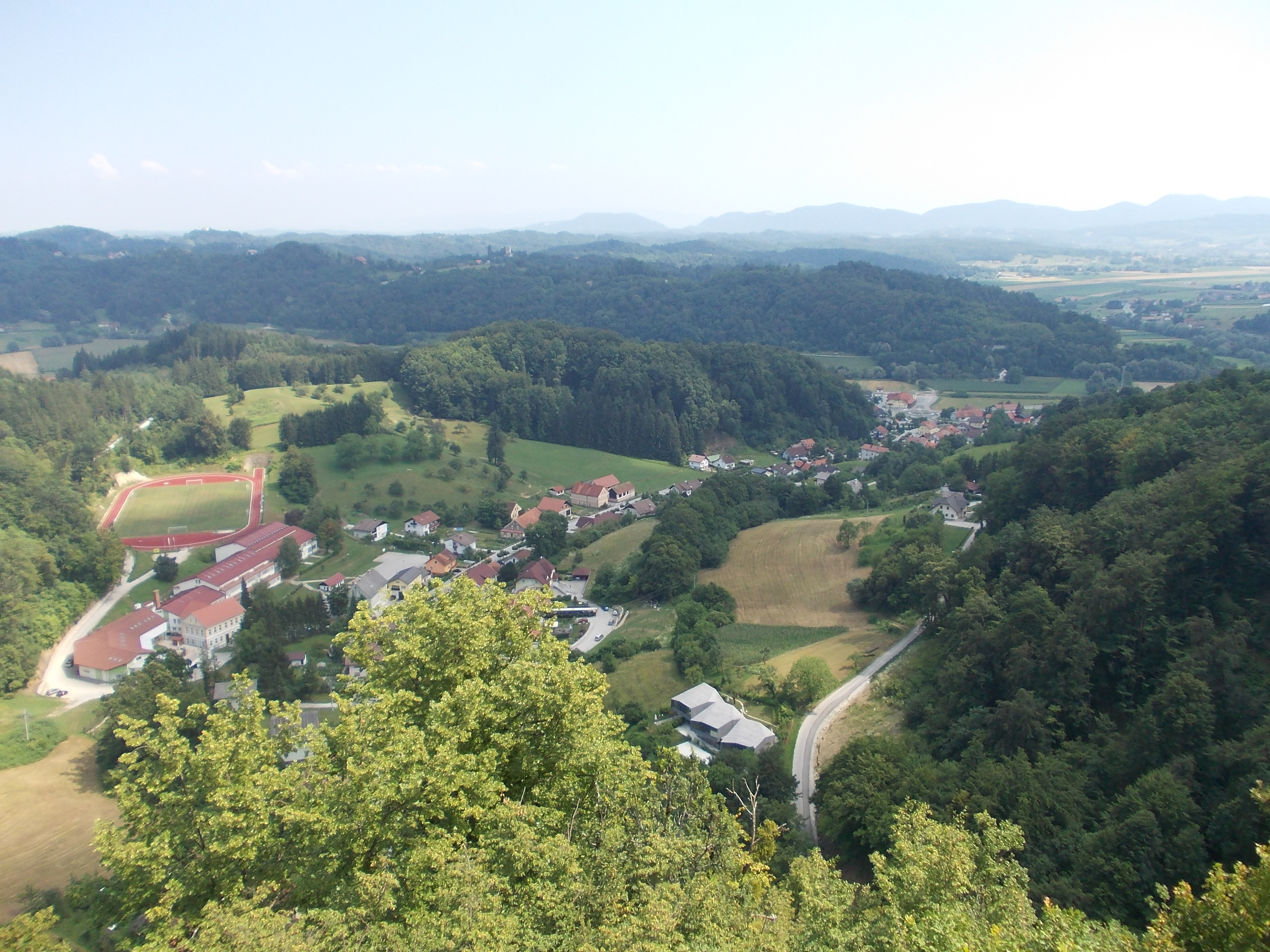

- Location in Slovenia
- Coordinates: 46°9′26.36″N 15°35′50.63″E
- Country: Slovenia
- Traditional region: Styria
- Statistical region: Savinja
- Municipality: Podčetrtek

Area
  - Total: 6.4 km^{2} (2.5 sq mi)
- Elevation: 219.3 m (719 ft)

Population (2019)
  - Total: 578

Podčetrtek (pronounced [ˈpoːtʃɛtəɾtək] or [pɔtʃɛˈtəɾtək]; German: Windisch Landsberg) is a settlement in eastern Slovenia by the river Sotla. It is the seat of the Municipality of Podčetrtek. The area belongs to the traditional region of Styria. It is now included in the Savinja Statistical Region.

== Name ==
The castle in Podčetrtek was mentioned in written sources in 1209 as de Landesperc (and as de Lonsperch in 1213, de Landesperch in 1227, and ze Lantsperch in 1328, among other names). The name appears on a 1763–87 map in both German and Slovene as Landsberg Windisch Pod Tschetertkom. The name implies that the castle above the settlement was once called *Četrtek (literally, 'Thursday'). The motivation for the name is unknown. It may refer to the day that court sentences were handed down, to a market day, to a day of corvée, or to the day when the settlement was founded. In the past the German name of the settlement was Windisch Landsberg.

== Castle ==
Most of the current structure of the castle dates to the early 17th century, when a two-story building with a central courtyard and two southern towers was built. It was adapted again in the late 18th century to the Baroque style, but retains its original features. After 1945 it was looted and fell into a state of disrepair, although the imposing building on a hill above the settlement remained a prominent landmark. In 2020 the building was bought by the Municipality of Podčetrtek, which restored the exterior and reopened the castle to visitors in 2024. Work on the interior is still under way, but a small part of the interior has been converted into a cafe with a terrace overlooking the settlement.

== Terme Olimia ==
Podčetrtek is best known for Terme Olimia, a thermal spa east of the city limits. It is one of the biggest spas in Slovenia with multiple hotels, indoor and outdoor pools, and saunas. An outdoor aqua-park called Aqualuna is located just north of the spa.

== Church ==
The parish church in the settlement is dedicated to Saint Lawrence and belongs to the Roman Catholic Diocese of Celje. The nave dates to the 14th century and the belfry is from the 17th century. In the early 18th century the sanctuary was extended.
