= Olimje =

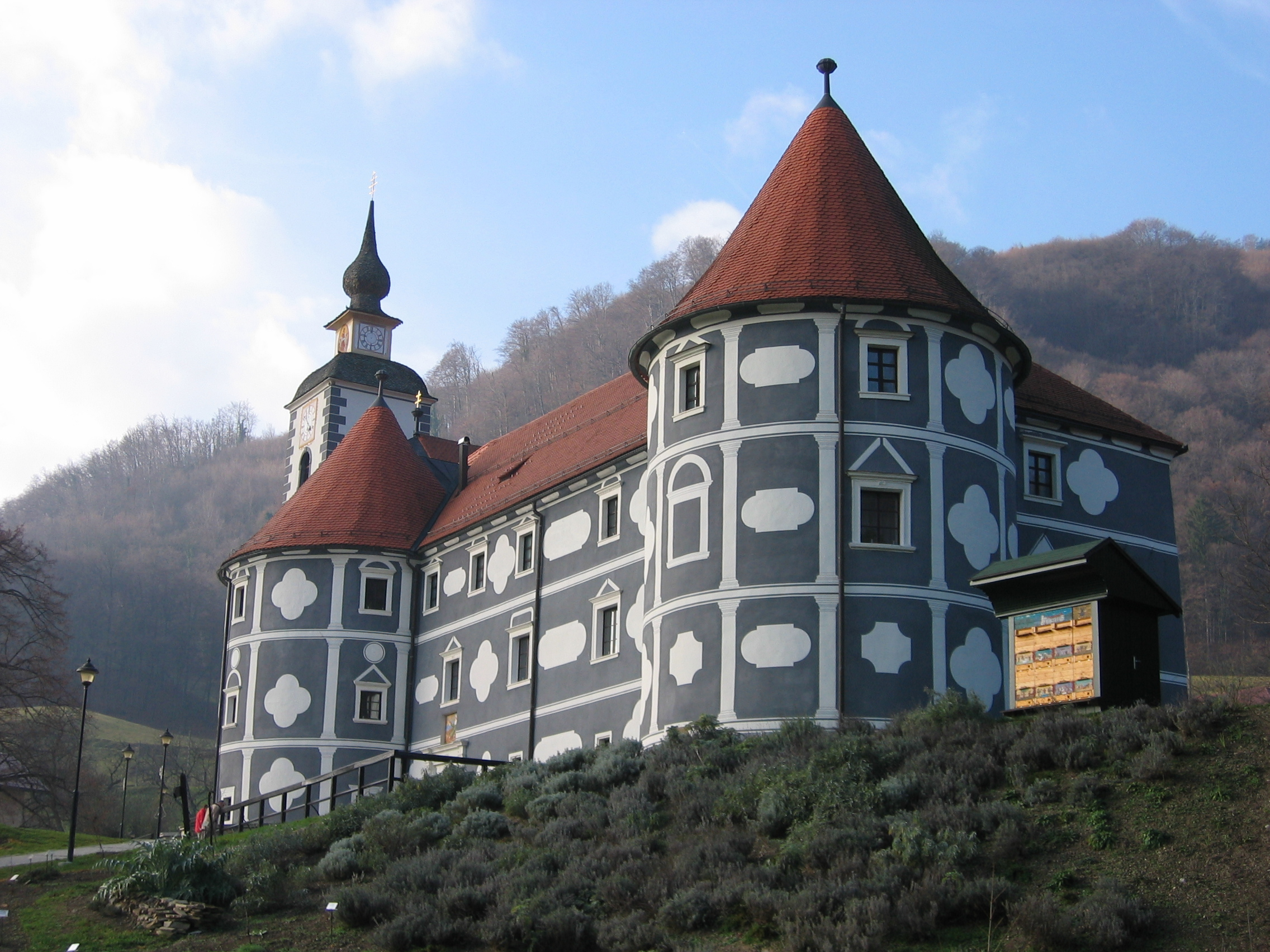
- Olimje Castle

- Location in Slovenia
- Coordinates: 46°9′13.6″N 15°34′8.89″E
- Country: Slovenia
- Traditional region: Styria
- Statistical region: Savinja
- Municipality: Podčetrtek

Area
  - Total: 9.5 km^{2} (3.7 sq mi)
- Elevation: 413.5 m (1,357 ft)

Population (2002)
  - Total: 250

Olimje (pronounced [ɔˈliːmjɛ]) is a settlement in the Municipality of Podčetrtek in eastern Slovenia. The area around Podčetrtek is part of the traditional region of Styria. It is now included in the Savinja Statistical Region.

== History ==
Olimje was created as a settlement in 1995 through the merger of the former settlements of Slake and Sopote.

== Castle ==
Olimje Castle is a 16th-century castle located in the settlement. In the 17th century, when it was converted to a monastery, the monastic church dedicated to the Assumption of Mary was built. It is now also the local parish church. A second church in the settlement is dedicated to Saint Andrew and is a Late Gothic single nave building dating to the 15th century.

== Gallery ==
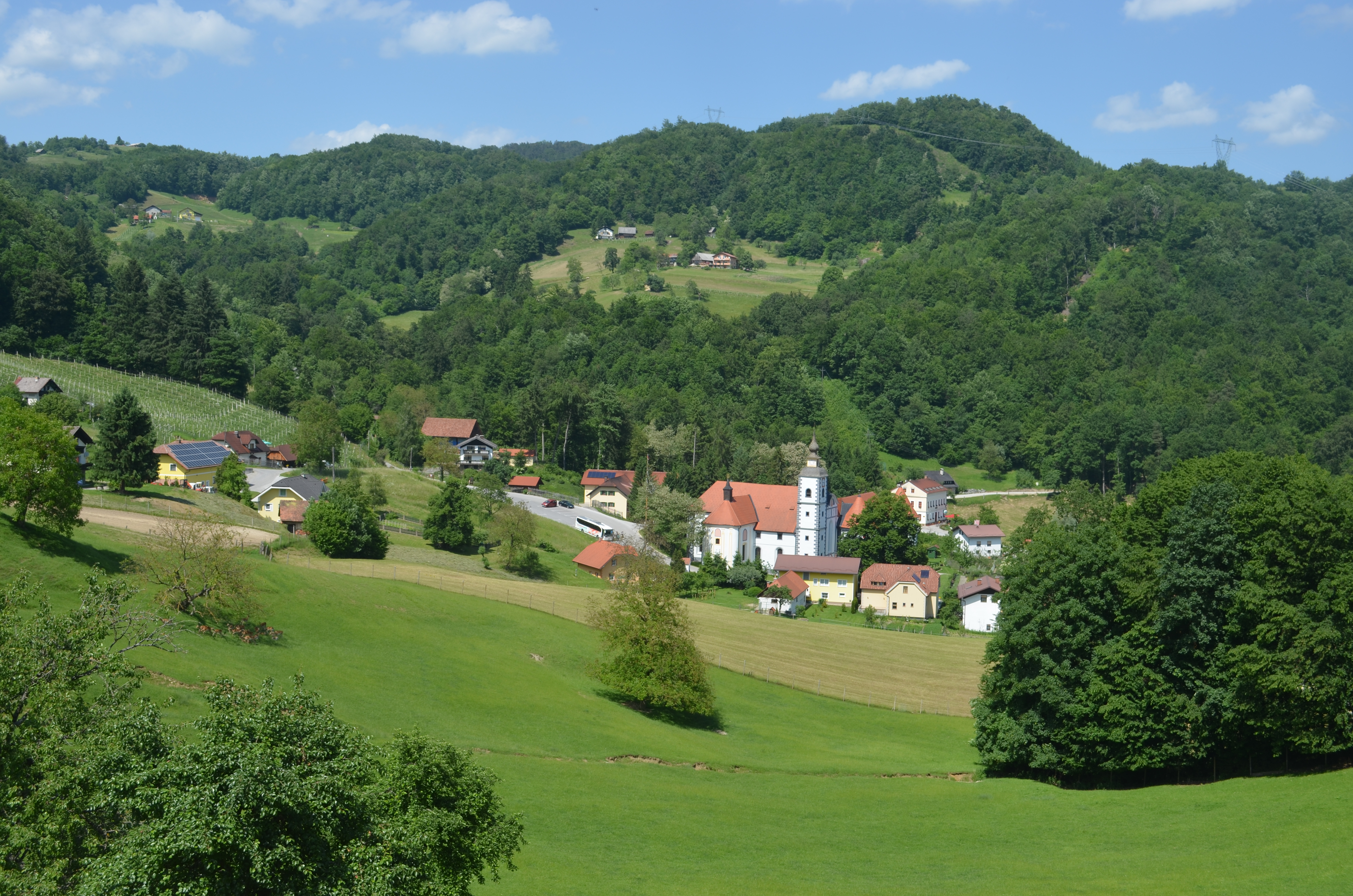
Olimje, Slovenia

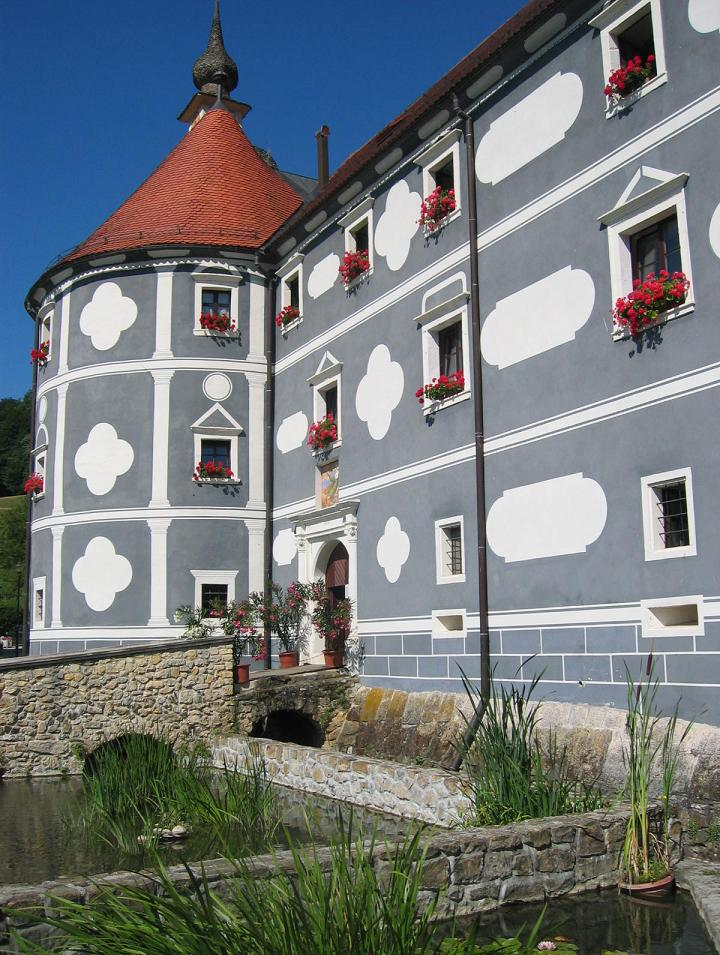
Olimje Castle, herb garden

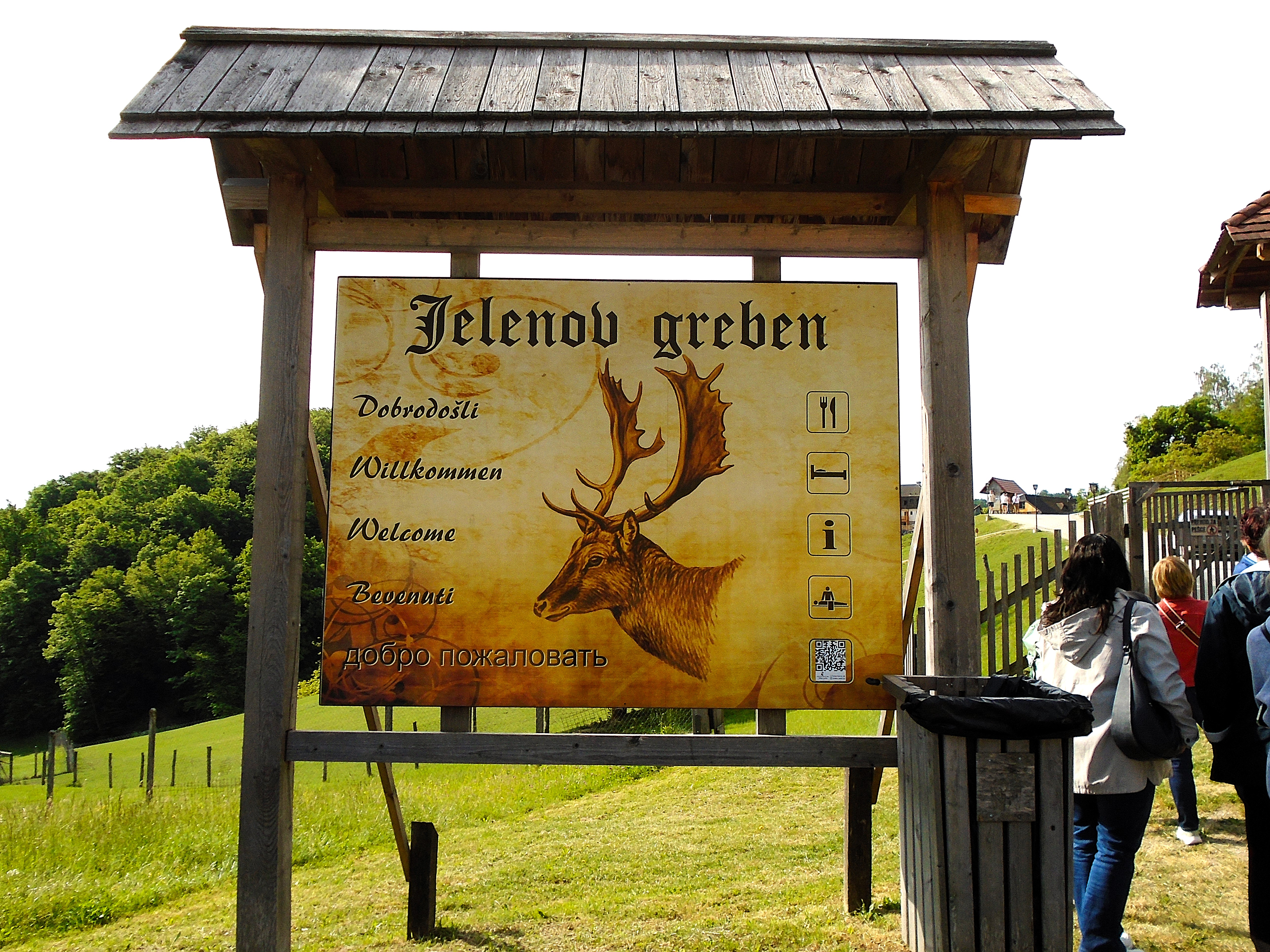
"Jelenov greben" (Deer's ridge) excursion resort in Olimje
