= Sveta Ema =

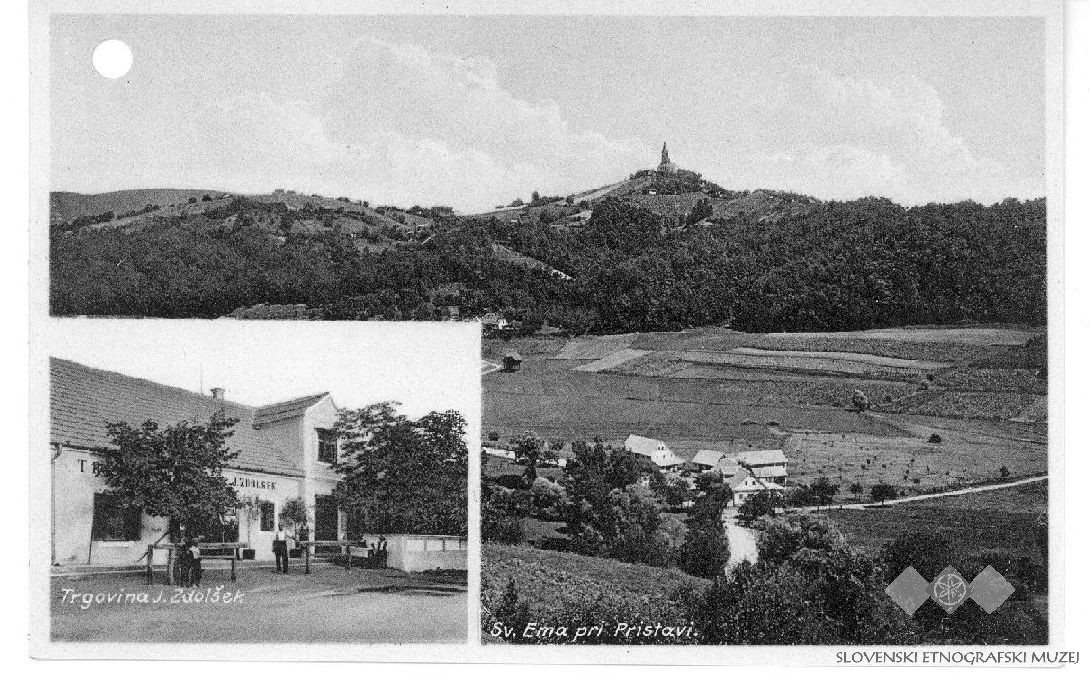
- Postcard of Sveta Ema

- Location in Slovenia
- Coordinates: 46°10′49.36″N 15°36′38.16″E
- Country: Slovenia
- Traditional region: Styria
- Statistical region: Savinja
- Municipality: Podčetrtek

Area
  - Total: 1.38 km^{2} (0.53 sq mi)
- Elevation: 316 m (1,037 ft)

Population (2002)
  - Total: 178

Sveta Ema (pronounced [ˈsʋeːta ˈeːma]) is a settlement in the Municipality of Podčetrtek in eastern Slovenia. The area around Podčetrtek is part of the traditional region of Styria. It is now included in the Savinja Statistical Region.

The settlement gets its name from the parish church, dedicated to Saint Hemma. It belongs to the Roman Catholic Diocese of Celje. It was built in 1717.
