= Sutla =

Sotla / Sutla
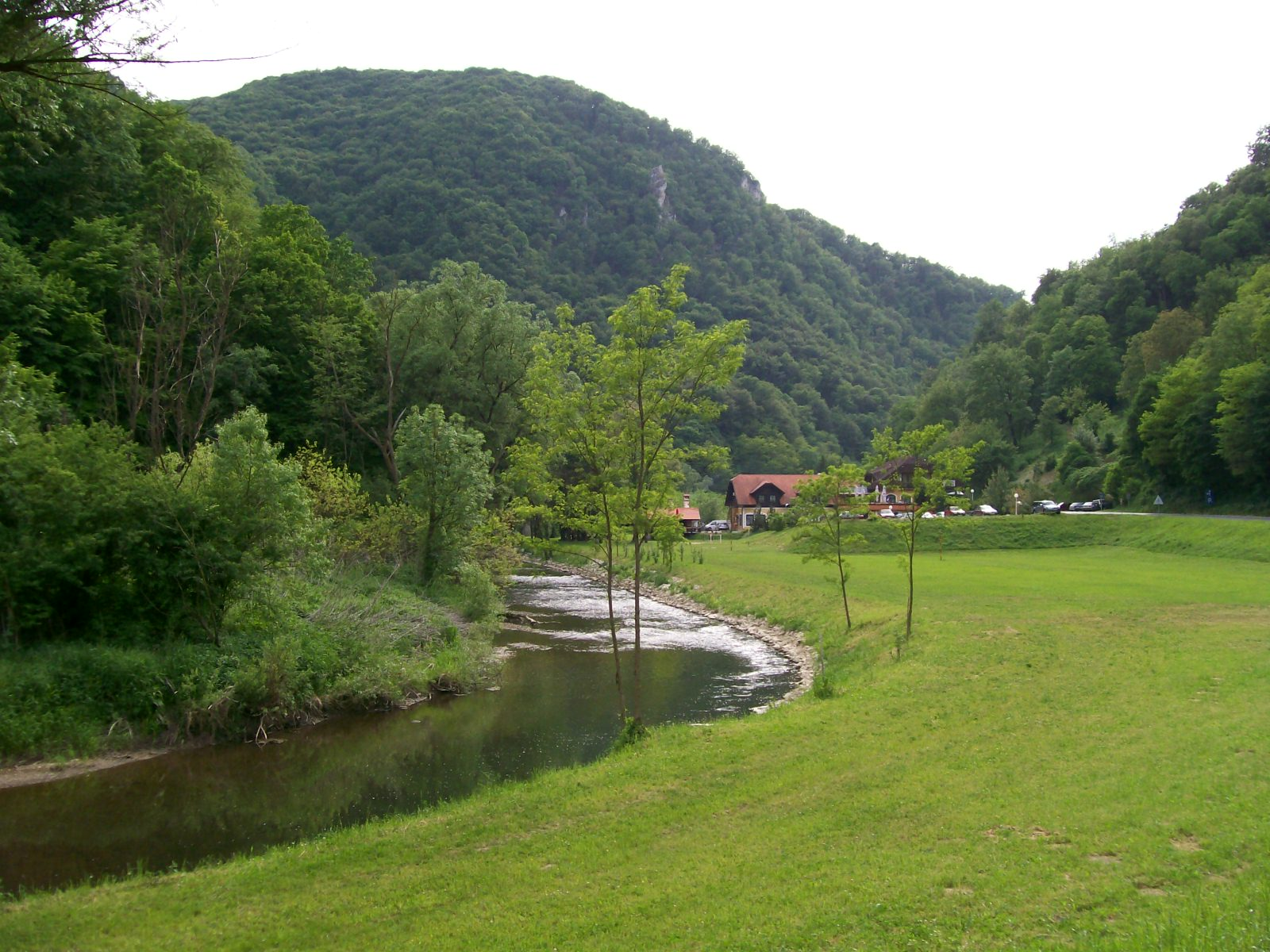
- Sutla River in Zelenjak, between Klanjec and Kumrovec

Location
- Countries: Slovenia; Croatia

Physical characteristics
- Source
  - elevation: 580 m (1,900 ft)
- Mouth
  - location: Sava
  - coordinates: 45°51′52″N 15°41′01″E
  - elevation: 135 m (443 ft)
- Length: 88.6 km (55.1 mi)
- Basin size: 584.3 km^{2} (225.6 sq mi)

Basin features
- Progression: Sava→ Danube→ Black Sea

The Sutla (Croatian: [sûtla]) or Sotla (Slovene: [ˈsóːtla]) is a river flowing through Slovenia and Croatia, mostly forming their border. It is a tributary to the Sava, itself a tributary to the Danube. It is 89 kilometres (55 mi) long and has a watershed area of 584 square kilometres (225 sq mi).

== Overview ==
The Sutla flows through the following municipalities:

- in Slovenia: Rogatec, Rogaška Slatina, Podčetrtek, Bistrica ob Sotli, Brežice
- in Croatia: Đurmanec, Hum na Sutli, Desinić, Zagorska Sela, Klanjec, Kraljevec na Sutli, Brdovec

The hydrological parameters of the Sutla are regularly monitored in Croatia at Zelenjak.

The division of the Sutla/Sotla basin area between Croatia and Slovenia is inconsistent in sources; Croatian sources claim either 343 km^{2} (132 sq mi) or 455 km^{2} (176 sq mi), while Slovenian sources claim either 477 km^{2} (184 sq mi) or 451 km^{2} (174 sq mi).

Kozje Park (Slovene: Kozjanski park), established in 1981 as Trebče Memorial Park (Spominski park Trebče), is located in Slovenian territory west of the Sotla. It covers 206 km^{2} (80 sq mi) of the landscape of the Kozje Hills (Kozjansko hribovje), including wetlands along the Sotla. It is the habitat of over 120 bird species and of about 950 higher plant species.

The earliest known mention of Sutla was in 1028, as Zontla. The name is pre-Slavic in origin and comes from *Sǫtъla. The root *Sont-/*Sant- does not have a known meaning.

== Bibliography ==
- Koren, Toni; Lauš, Boris; Šašić, Martina; Mihoci, Iva; Štih, Ana; Bralić, Petra; Gomboc, Stanislav (2017-12-31). "Contribution to the Knowledge of the Butterfly Fauna (Lepidoptera: Papilionoidea) of Hrvatsko Zagorje, Croatia". Natura Croatica: Periodicum Musei Historiae Naturalis Croatici. 26 (2): 167–196. doi:10.20302/NC.2017.26.15. eISSN 1848-7386.
