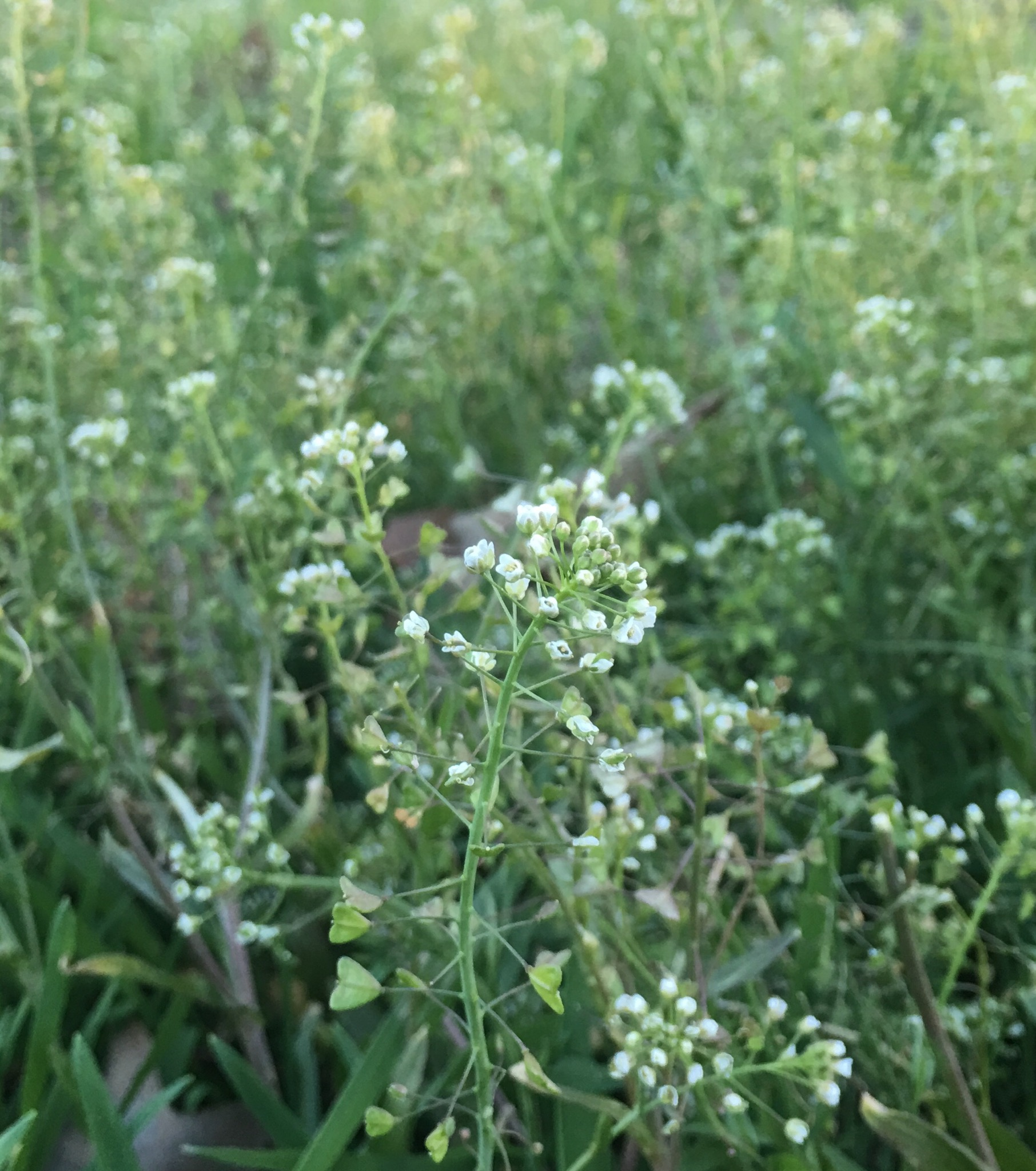
- Shepherd's purse, Capsella bursa-pastoris

Scientific classification
- Kingdom: Plantae
- Clade: Tracheophytes
- Clade: Angiosperms
- Clade: Eudicots
- Clade: Rosids
- Order: Brassicales
- Family: Brassicaceae
- Genus: Capsella; Medik.

Synonyms
- Bursa Boehm.; Bursa-pastoris Ség.; Marsypocarpus Neck.; Nasturtium Roth, nom. illeg.; Opizia Raf.; Rodschiedia G.Gaertn., B.Mey. & Scherb.

= Capsella (plant) =

Genus of flowering plants in the mustard family

Capsella is a genus of herbaceous annual and biennial plants in the family Brassicaceae. It is a close relative of Arabidopsis, Neslia, and Halimolobos.

Some authors circumscribe Capsella to contain only three species: Capsella bursa-pastoris, Capsella rubella and Capsella grandiflora. As of 2025, Kew's Plants of the World Online list eight species.

Capsella rubella is a self-fertilizing species that became self-compatible 50,000 to 100,000 years ago. Its outcrossing progenitor was Capsella grandiflora. In general, the shift from outcrossing to self-fertilization is among the most common transitions in flowering plants. Capsella rubella is studied as a model for understanding the evolution of self-fertilization.

The name is said to derive from Latin capsa, a box or case, alluding to fruit resembling a medieval wallet or purse; the suffix -ella denotes "lesser".

== Species ==
Species include:

- Capsella bursa-pastoris (L.) Medik.
- Capsella × gracilis Gren. (sterile hybrid)
- Capsella grandiflora (Fauché & Chaub.) Boiss.
- Capsella lycia Stapf
- Capsella mexicana Hemsl.
- Capsella orientalis Klokov
- Capsella rubella Reut.
- Capsella tasmanica (Hook.) F.Muell.

=== Formerly placed here ===
- Asta schaffneri (S.Watson) O.E.Schulz (as Capsella schaffneri S.Watson)
