= Capsella × gracilis =

Scientific classification
- Kingdom: Plantae
- Clade: Tracheophytes
- Clade: Angiosperms
- Clade: Eudicots
- Clade: Rosids
- Order: Brassicales
- Family: Brassicaceae
- Genus: Capsella
- Species: C. × gracilis

Binomial name
- Capsella × gracilis Gren.

Synonyms
- Capsella × gelmii Murr; Bursa × gracilis (Gren.) Druce; Capsella bursa-pastoris f. gracilis (Gren.) Cout.; Capsella bursa-pastoris var. gracilis (Gren.) Caldesi; Capsella bursa-pastoris subsp. gracilis (Gren.) Hobk.; Thlaspi bursa-pastoris var. gracile (Gren.) Burnat

Species of flowering plant

Capsella × gracilis is a sterile plant that were generated from a hybridization between C. bursa-pastoris and C. rubella. It is native to France, Switzerland, Italy, European Turkey, Algeria, and Morocco.
