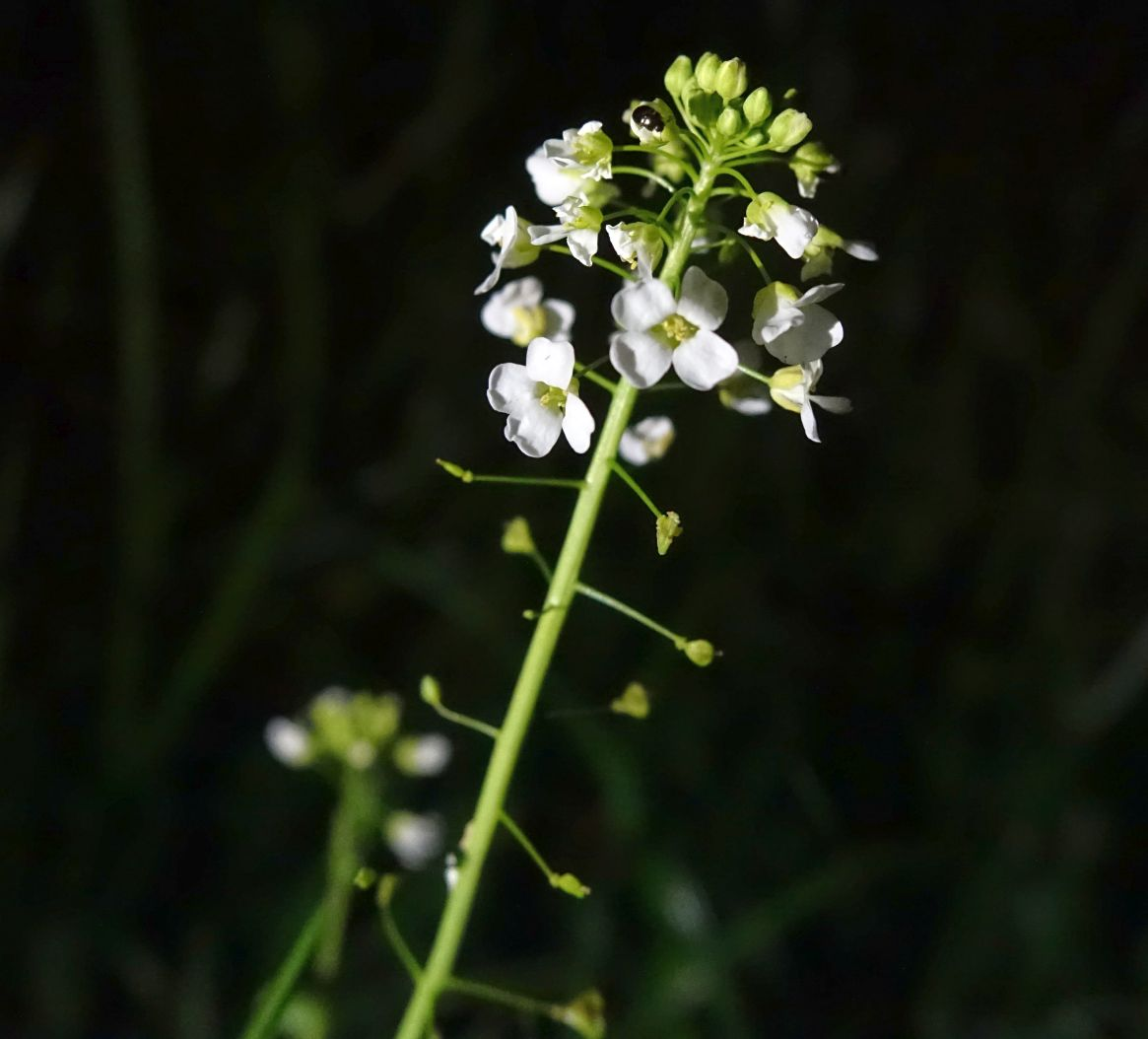

Scientific classification
- Kingdom: Plantae
- Clade: Tracheophytes
- Clade: Angiosperms
- Clade: Eudicots
- Clade: Rosids
- Order: Brassicales
- Family: Brassicaceae
- Genus: Capsella
- Species: C. grandiflora

Binomial name
- Capsella grandiflora (Fauché & Chaub.) Boiss.

Synonyms
- Bursa grandiflora (Fauché & Chaub.) Kuntze; Thlaspi grandiflorum Fauché & Chaub.

= Capsella grandiflora =

Species of flowering plant

Capsella grandiflora is a species of flowering plant in the Brassicaceae family. It is referred to by the common name grand shepherd's-purse and is a close relative of Arabidopsis thaliana. It is predicted together with C. orientalis to be the surviving progenitor of C. bursa-pastoris.

The main signature of this plant compared to other Capsella species is its wide flower petals. Together with C. rubella, the species is used as a model plant to study the evolution of self-incompatibility into self-compatibility in plant reproduction.
