= Susedgrad =

Ruined castle in western Zagreb, Croatia

Susedgrad Castle
- Zagreb, Croatia
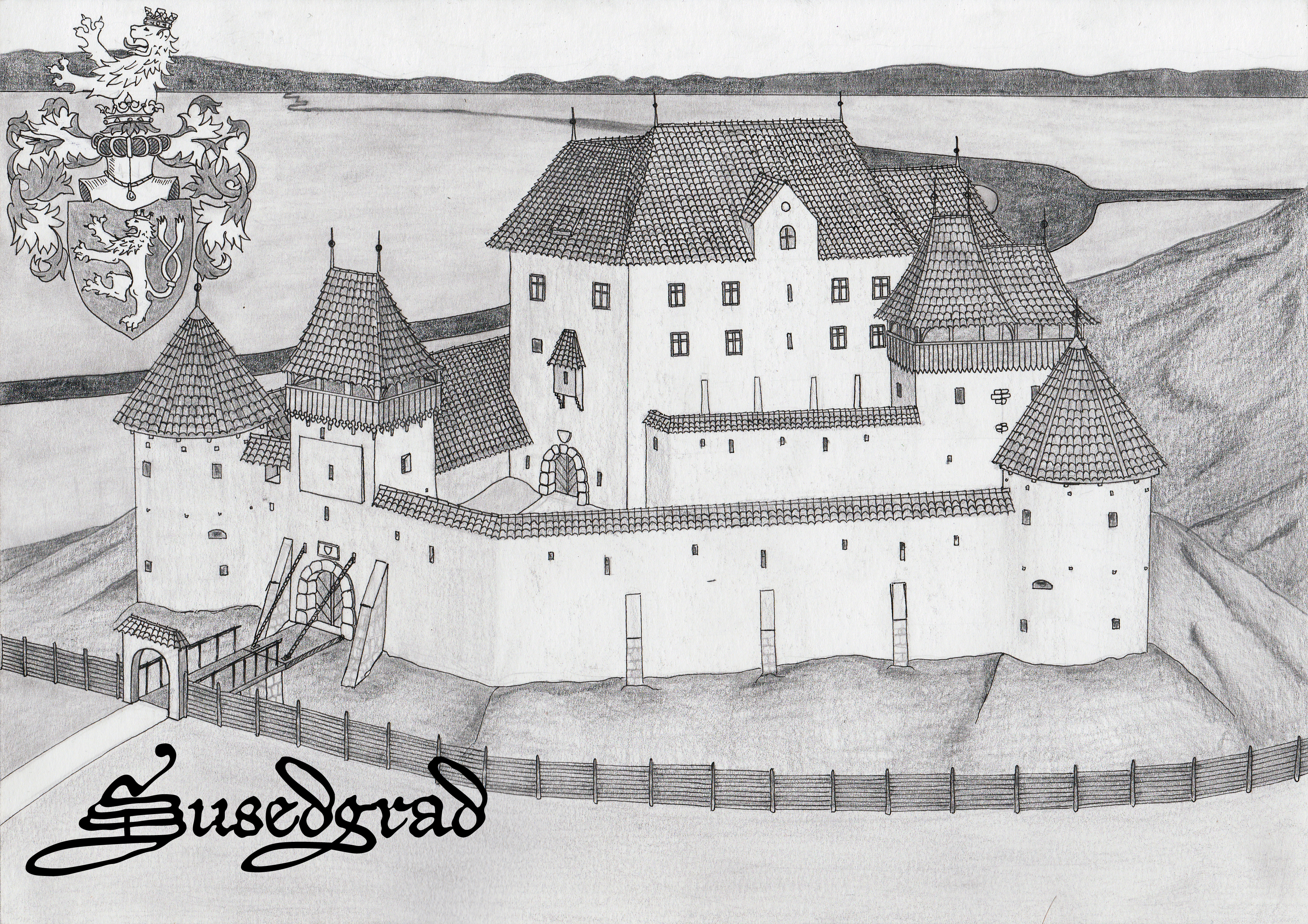
- Attempted reconstruction of Susedgrad's early appearance with confluence of Sava and Krapina rivers visible behind.

Site information
- Type: Hilltop castle
- Owner: Cistercians; Anjou royal family; Aka family; Johann Katzianer; Henning family; Tahy family; Henning family; Sermage family; Jelačić family
- Condition: in ruins

Location
- Coordinates: 45.82106°N 15.83105°E
- Height: Built on 194 meters high hilltop

Site history
- Built: 14th century
- In use: 14th–17th century
- Materials: stone
- Demolished: Left to ruin after 17th century.
- Battles/wars: Hundred Years' Croatian–Ottoman War - several akinji raids occurred nearby.; Susedgrad Wars; Croatian-Slovene Peasant Revolt

Cultural Good of Croatia
- Type: Protected cultural good
- Reference no.: Z-7528

Susedgrad Castle (Hungarian: Szomszédvár), or earlier also only Sused, is a ruined medieval fortress on the far-western hill of mount Medvednica, while also marking the far-western part of modern-day Zagreb, Croatia.

== Position ==
As written on billboard near Susedgrad ruins, the fortress overwatched an important crossroad at Krapina-Sava confluence, and therefore enabled control over nearby land and waterways. Archeological and paleontological findings suggest that the place was settled since antiquity. Nearby quarries are also believed to exist since antiquity, supplying stone for building forts and churches in the surrounding area.

== History ==
=== Medieval Slavonia ===
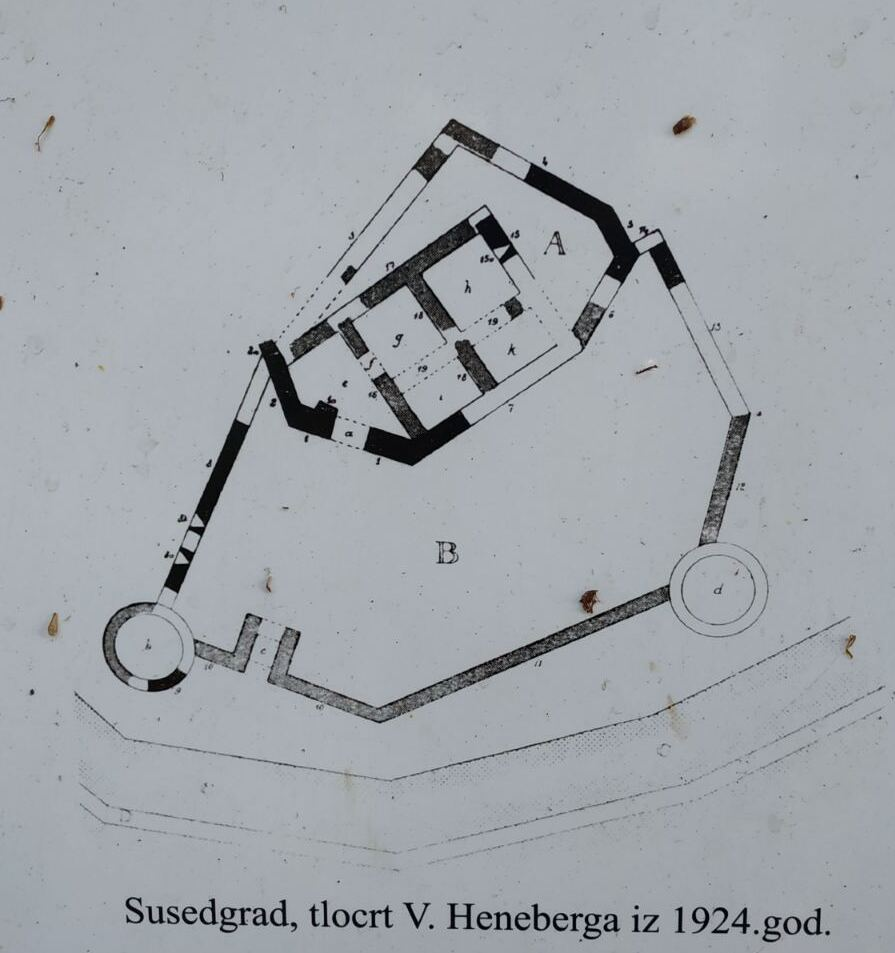
A Susedgrad Castle layout.

Written sources from 1299 and 1287 indicate that the castle was constructed somewhere throughout the second half of 13th century, when it was owned by Cistercian order. It is then mentioned in 1316 in one charter of king Charles I of Hungary as his property. The castle was a royal property until 1345 it was given by king Louis The Great to Nikola III. Aka - Toth, who supported king Louis in his wars. Nikola III. also gained control over significant possessions in Hrvatsko Zagorje, which would subsequently evolve in what would later be known as Susedgrad-Stubica Segniory. The family branch which controlled Susedgrad became known as Toths of Susedgrad. Toths however died out, and their last heiress - Doroteja, married to Nicolas Henning, whose family in 1439 took over rights to Aka's possessions.

=== Early Modern Period ===
Hennings held complete control over the castle, until 1502 when they died out, after which several contestants laid claims to the castle through the female line. Legal dispute arose over the question, whether such "female" claims are legal, or does the king owns a right to give the castle to the new owner. In the end, emperor Ferdinand gave one half of the estates to Styrian noble Andrew Teuffenbach who changed his last name to Henning through his mother's line, while he gave another half to Andras Bathory, also a Henning descendant.

=== Henning-Tahy Wars ===
Andrew Teuffenbach - Henning died in 1563, while his wife Ursula Meknitzer Henning lived on. While he was alive, Teuffenbach leased half of his Susedgrad estate to his wife Ursula Meknitzer, while he leased the other part to Andras Batory. Since he was often away in Hungary, Batory sold his complete rights to both Susedgrad and Stubica to Ferenc Tahy for 50 000 Forints, who thus became a majority owner. Ursula, however, refused to accept Tahy as a rightful owner, while Tahy also refused to give in to Ursula which brought these two nobles into confrontation. Both Ursula and Tahy started gathering powerful allies around them, with Ursula enjoying support of Croatian viceban Ambroz Gregorijanec, while Tahy enjoyed support of Croatian ban Peter Erdody. Ursula made the first move 1565 when she gathered an army of some 800 local peasants had Tahy's family kicked out of the possession. When Croatian ban Petar Erdody gathered Army of Croatian ban to punish her, Ursula and her allies again gathered 3000 strong peasant army and routed Army of Croatian ban in Battle of Susedgrad in July 1565. The issue was then lifted to Croatian parliament who raised a lawsuit against Ursula, while Royal Chamber confiscated her possessions until the lawsuit is resolved. Tahy was meanwhile brought back in following year, and started to make revenge against local peasants who fought along Ursula against him, and this would eventually escalate in Croatian-Slovene Peasant Revolt of 1573. Since Tahy died same year, Hennings bought back Tahy's part of the estate from his descendants in 1574. Later the owners were members of the Mlakovečki noble family.

=== Abandonment ===
Historian Stjepan Laljak notes that in 1590, Susedgrad was shaken by a violent earthquake. In the beginning of 17th century, the castle burnt down, and it was later abandoned and left to ruin. One of the main reasons was that there was no need for a large fort since danger from Ottoman akinji incursions diminished. Also, the methods of warfare evolved, making this castle useless.

=== Contemporary Period ===
The castle gave name to today neighbourhood of Podsused, meaning literally "under Sused".

For a while in the late 20th century the name Susedgrad had been used for a city municipality that was dissolved in the 1999 municipal reform and has subsequently been transformed into Podsused - Vrapče and Stenjevec city districts.

== Restoration initiatives ==
What remained of the castle was significantly damaged in 2020 Zagreb earthquake. Despite wishes of local people to restore the castle, according to writing of Croatian daily Večernji list, Republic of Croatia and City of Zagreb are for years unable to reach an agreement about the land ownership and financing of the project so everything is standing still. Meanwhile, the castle remains are left to ruin.

== Location and access ==
ZET bus line 123 from Črnomerec terminal is the closest transport to the ruins at the "(Aleja) Seljačke bune" stop. With a short walk (additional 5 min) from the center of Podsused, it can also be accessed by bus lines 116, 119, 122, 172, 176 and 177, and by HŽ suburban commuter trains directly from the city center.

== Flora ==
The Forest Park Susedgrad (Croatian: Park šuma Susedgrad) is home to the following native species:

- Acer campestre (𖠰)
- Acer platanoides (⛫)
- Acer pseudoplatanus (𖠰)
- Achillea millefolium (⚘)
- Actaea spicata (⛫)
- Aegopodium podagraria (⛫)
- Ajuga reptans (⚘)
- Alliaria petiolata (⛫)
- Allium sp. (⚘)
- Allium ursinum (𖠰)
- Anthriscus cerefolium (⚘)
- Anthriscus sylvestris (⛫)
- Aposeris foetida (⛫)
- Arabidopsis arenosa (⛫⛕)
- Arctium lappa (⛕)
- Arctium minus (⚘)
- Arrhenatherum elatius (⚘)
- Artemisia vulgaris (⛕)
- Arum maculatum (𖠰)
- Asarum europaeum (𖠰)
- Asplenium ceterach (𖠰)
- Asplenium scolopendrium (⛫)
- Asplenium trichomanes (⛫)
- Ballota nigra (⛕)
- Bellis perennis (𖠰)
- Bromus sterilis (⚘)
- Campanula trachelium (⛫)
- Capsella bursa-pastoris (⚘)
- Capsella rubella (⛕)
- Cardamine bulbifera (⛕)
- Cardamine impatiens (⛕)
- Carex spicata (⛕)
- Carex sylvatica (𖠰)
- Carpinus betulus (𖠰)
- Celtis australis (𖠰)
- Centaurea jacea (⚘)
- Cephalanthera longifolia (⛫)
- Cerastium sp. (𖠰)
- Chaerophyllum temulum (⛫⛕)
- Chelidonium majus (⛫⛕)
- Chondrilla juncea (⚘)
- Cirsium vulgare (⛕)
- Clematis vitalba (⛫⛕)
- Convolvulus arvensis (⚘)
- Cornus sanguinea (⛕)
- Corydalis solida (𖠰)
- Corylus avellana (⛫⛕)
- Crataegus laevigata (⛫⛕)
- Crepis biennis (𖠰)
- Crepis nicaeensis (⛕)
- Cruciata laevipes (⚘)
- Cyclamen purpurascens (⛫)
- Dactylis glomerata (⚘)
- Daucus carota (⚘)
- Dioscorea communis (𖠰)
- Euonymus europaeus (⛕)
- Euphorbia dulcis (⛫)
- Fagus sylvatica (⛫⛕)
- Ficaria verna (⚘)
- Fragaria vesca (⛫)
- Fraxinus excelsior (⛕)
- Gagea lutea (⛫)
- Gagea villosa (⛕)
- Galanthus nivalis (𖠰)
- Galeopsis pubescens (⛫)
- Galium aparine (⛕)
- Galium mollugo (⚘)
- Galium odoratum (⛫)
- Galium verum (⚘)
- Geranium phaeum (𖠰)
- Geranium robertianum (𖠰)
- Geum urbanum (⛕)
- Glechoma hederacea (𖠰)
- Hedera helix (⛫⛕)
- Helleborus atrorubens (𖠰)
- Heracleum sphondylium (𖠰)
- Holcus lanatus (⛕)
- Hordeum murinum (⚘)
- Knautia arvensis (⚘)
- Lactuca muralis (⛫)
- Lactuca serriola (⛫)
- Lamium galeobdolon (⛫)
- Lamium maculatum (⛫⛕)
- Lamium orvala (𖠰)
- Lamium purpureum (𖠰)
- Lolium perenne (⚘)
- Lonicera × purpusii (⛕)
- Malva sylvestris (⛕)
- Medicago lupulina (⛕)
- Melilotus officinalis (⛫)
- Mercurialis perennis (⛫)
- Myosotis sylvatica (𖠰)
- Ornithogalum umbellatum
- Oxalis dillenii (⛕)
- Parietaria officinalis (⛫)
- Physalis alkekengi (⚘)
- Poa trivialis (⚘)
- Polygonatum multiflorum (⛫)
- Pinus nigra (𖠰)
- Plantago lanceolata (⚘)
- Plantago major (⛕)
- Polygonum aviculare (⚘)
- Potentilla reptans (⚘)
- Primula vulgaris (𖠰)
- Prunus avium (𖠰)
- Pteridium aquilinum (⛕)
- Pulmonaria officinalis (𖠰)
- Quercus pubescens (⛫⛕)
- Ranunculus sp. (𖠰)
- Ranunculus bulbosus (𖠰)
- Ranunculus languinosus (𖠰)
- Ranunculus repens (⚘)
- Rorippa sylvestris (⛕)
- Rubus caesius (⚘)
- Rumex acetosella (⚘)
- Rumex crispus (⛕)
- Rumex obtusifolius (𖠰)
- Ruscus aculeatus (⛫)
- Salvia glutinosa (⛫)
- Sambucus nigra (𖠰)
- Sanicula epipactis (⛫⛕)
- Sanicula europaea (⛕)
- Scilla bifolia (⛕)
- Senecio ovatus (⛫)
- Silene latifolia ssp. alba (⛕)
- Solanum nigrum (𖠰)
- Sonchus oleraceus (⛕)
- Staphylea pinnata (⛕)
- Stellaria holostea (⚘)
- Stellaria media (⚘)
- Symphoricarpos orbiculatus (⛕)
- Symphytum officinale (⛕)
- Symphytum tuberosum (𖠰)
- Taraxacum officinale (⚘)
- Thlaspi perfoliatum (⛕)
- Tilia cordata (𖠰)
- Tilia platyphyllos (𖠰)
- Trifolium campestre (⛕)
- Trifolium pratense (⚘)
- Trifolium repens (⚘)
- Ulmus minor (⛕)
- Urtica dioica (𖠰)
- Verbena officinalis (⛕)
- Veronica chamaedrys (⛫)
- Veronica hederifolia (⛫)
- Veronica opaca (⚘)
- Veronica verna (⛕)
- Viburnum lantana (⛕)
- Vicia sativa (⚘)
- Vinca minor (⛕)
- Viola alba (𖠰)
- Viola odorata (𖠰)
- Viola reichenbachiana (𖠰)

𖠰 forest and eslewhere ⚘ meadow but not forest ⛫ ruins only ⛕ roads and paths only

Invasive and introduced species:

- Acer negundo (𖠰)
- Aesculus hippocastanum (⛫⛕)
- Ailanthus altissima (⛕)
- Erigeron annuus (⛫⛕)
- Larix decidua (𖠰)
- Picea abies (⛫⛕)
- Pinus sylvestris (⛫)
- Prunus domestica (⚘)
- Robinia pseudoacacia (⛫)
- Taxus baccata (⛫⛕)
- Veronica persica (⚘)

Of these, Robinia pseudoacacia is the largest problem, having colonised the ruins of Susedgrad, speeding up its erosion. Only Erigeron annuus and Veronica persica are found throughout. Ailanthus altissima is found in the lower and eastern parts, especially along the path. Acer negundo is only found in the parking lot.

Endangered species include Taxus baccata (VU), Cephalanthera longifolia (NT), Cyclamen purpurascens (NT), Veronica opaca (NT), V. verna (NT), Galanthus nivalis (LC), Ruscus aculeatus (LC), and Helleborus atrorubens (LC). Of these, C. longifolia and Veronica opaca were only found in one locality each, near the ruins, and V. verna in one locality on a path bordering the forest. R. aculeatus was found in only two localities, within the ruins. C. purpurascens is found in multiple localities, though mostly around the ruins and moat. G. nivalis and H. atrorubens are not endangered within the park.

Inexperienced botanists would need to learn to distinguish between:

- Acer campestre and especially A. platanoides and A. pseudoplatanus
- Aegopodium podagraria, Anthriscus cerefolium, and A. sylvestris
- Arabidopsis arenosa, Capsella bursa-pastors C. rubella, and Thlaspi perfoliatum
- Arctium lappa and A. minus
- Chaerophyllum temulum, Daucus carota
- Arrhenatherum elatius, Bromus sterilis, Dactylis glomerata, Holcus lanatus, Hordeum murinum, Lolium perenne, and Poa trivialis
- Asarum europaeum and Ficaria verna
- Asplenium ceterach and A. trichomanes
- Carex spicata and C. sylvatica
- Carpinus betulus and Fagus sylvatica
- Cephalanthera longifolia, Gagea lutea, G. villosa, Galanthus nivalis, Ornithogalum umbellatum, and Scilla bifolia
- Galeopsis pubescens, Lamium galeobdolon, L. maculatum, L. orvala, L. purpureum, Salvia glutinosa, and Urtica dioica
- Corylus avellana and Ulmus minor
- Crepis biennis, C. nicaeensis, Chondrilla juncea, Mycelis muralis, Lactuca muralis, L. serriola, Sonchus oleraceus, and Taraxacum officinale
- Cruciata laevipes, Galium aparine, G. mollugo, G. odoratum, an G. verum
- Glechoma hederacea and young Alliaria petiolata
- Medicago sativa, Melilotus officinalis, Oxalis dillenii
- Rumex crispus and R. obtusifolius
- Sambucus nigra and Staphylea pinnata; Trifolium campestre, T. pratense, and T. repens
- Potentilla reptans, Ranunculus bulbosus, R. languinosus, and R. repens
- Sanicula europaea and S. epipactis
- Stellaria holostea and S. media
- Tilia cordata and T. platyphyllos
- Veronica chamaedrys, V. hederifolia, V. opaca, and V. verna
- Viola alba, V. odorata, and V. reichenbachiania

== Gallery ==
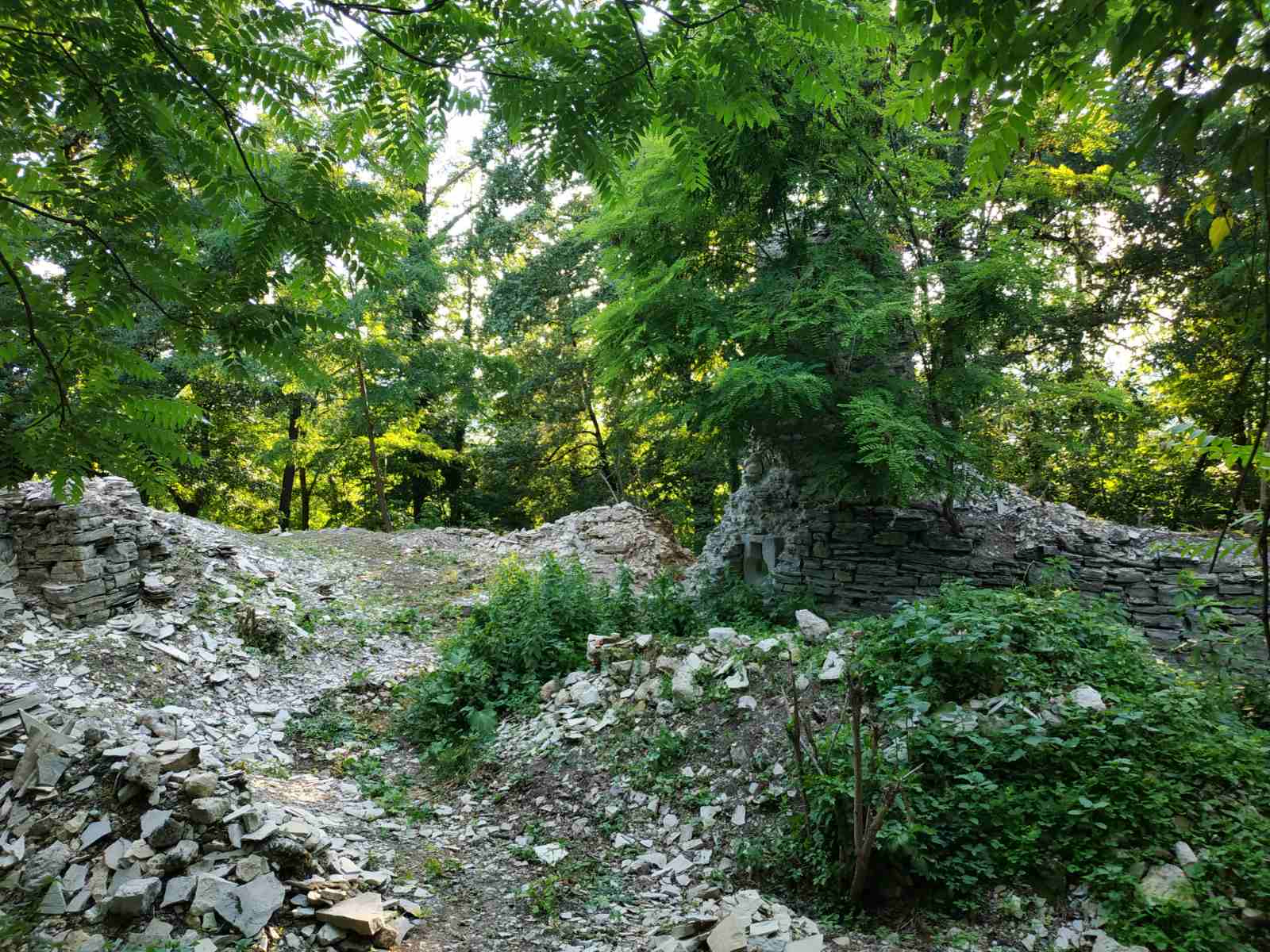
A southwestern part of Susedgrad remains.

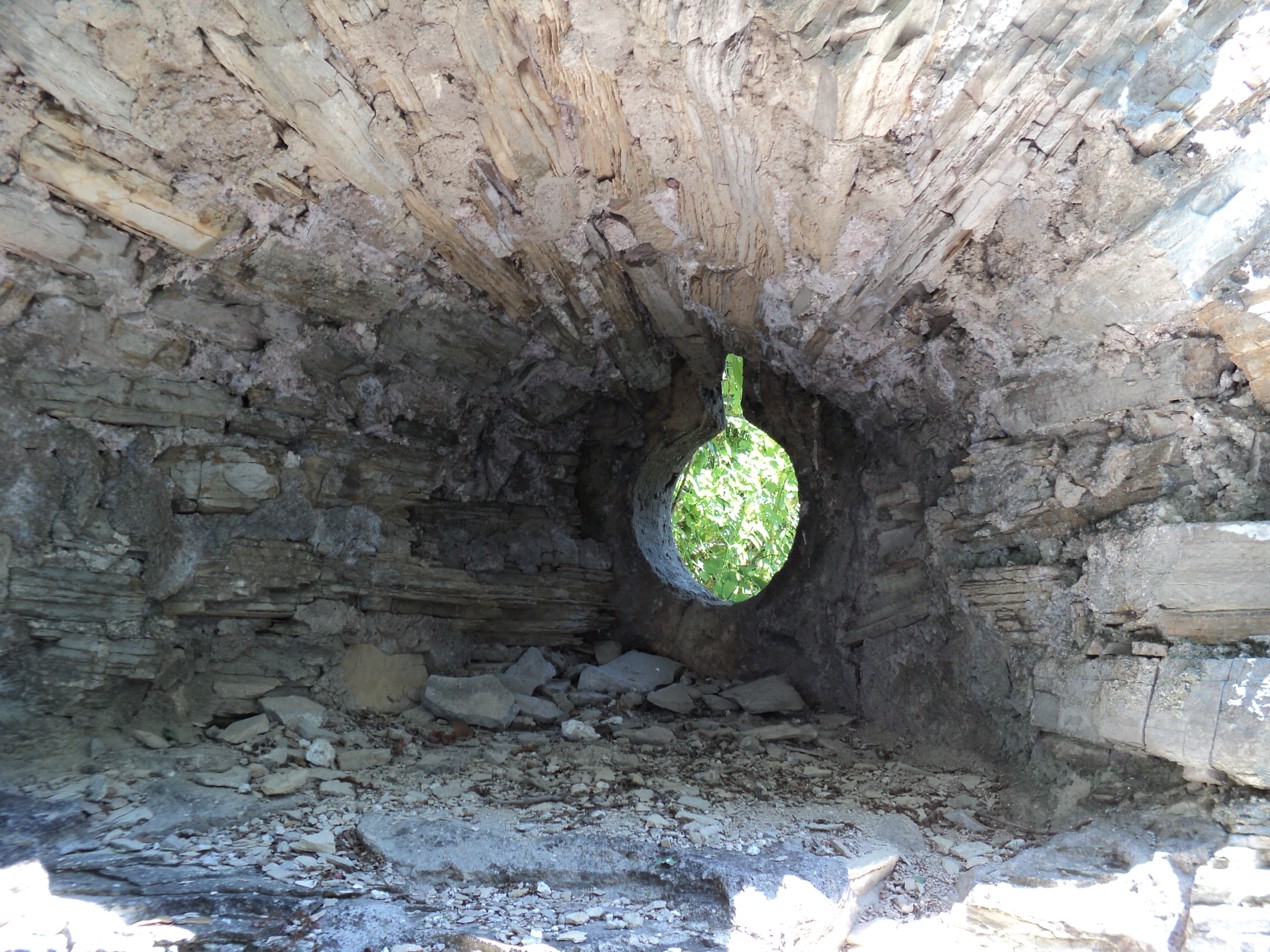
An embrasure in remaining ruins.

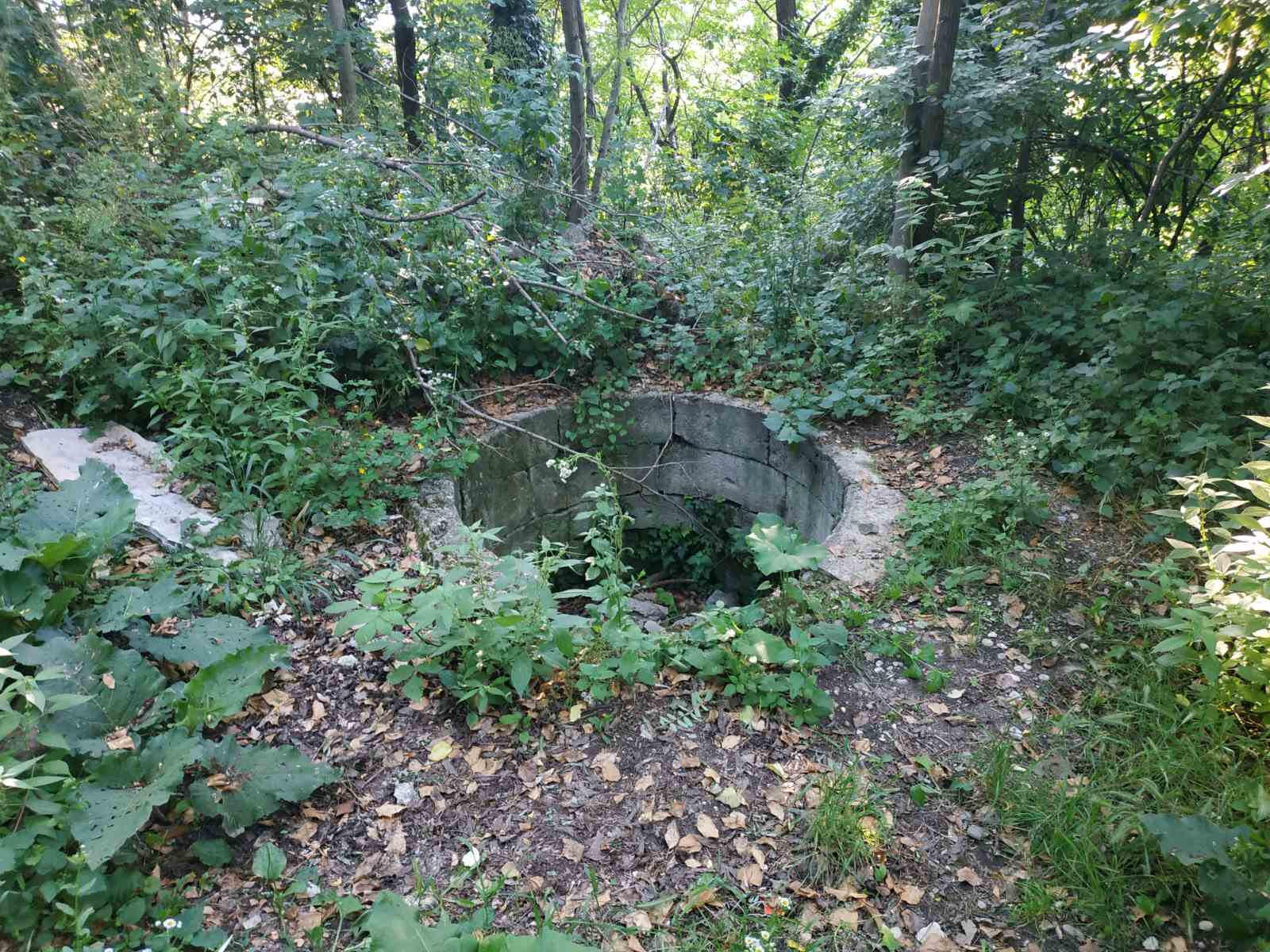
An old well inside castle remains.

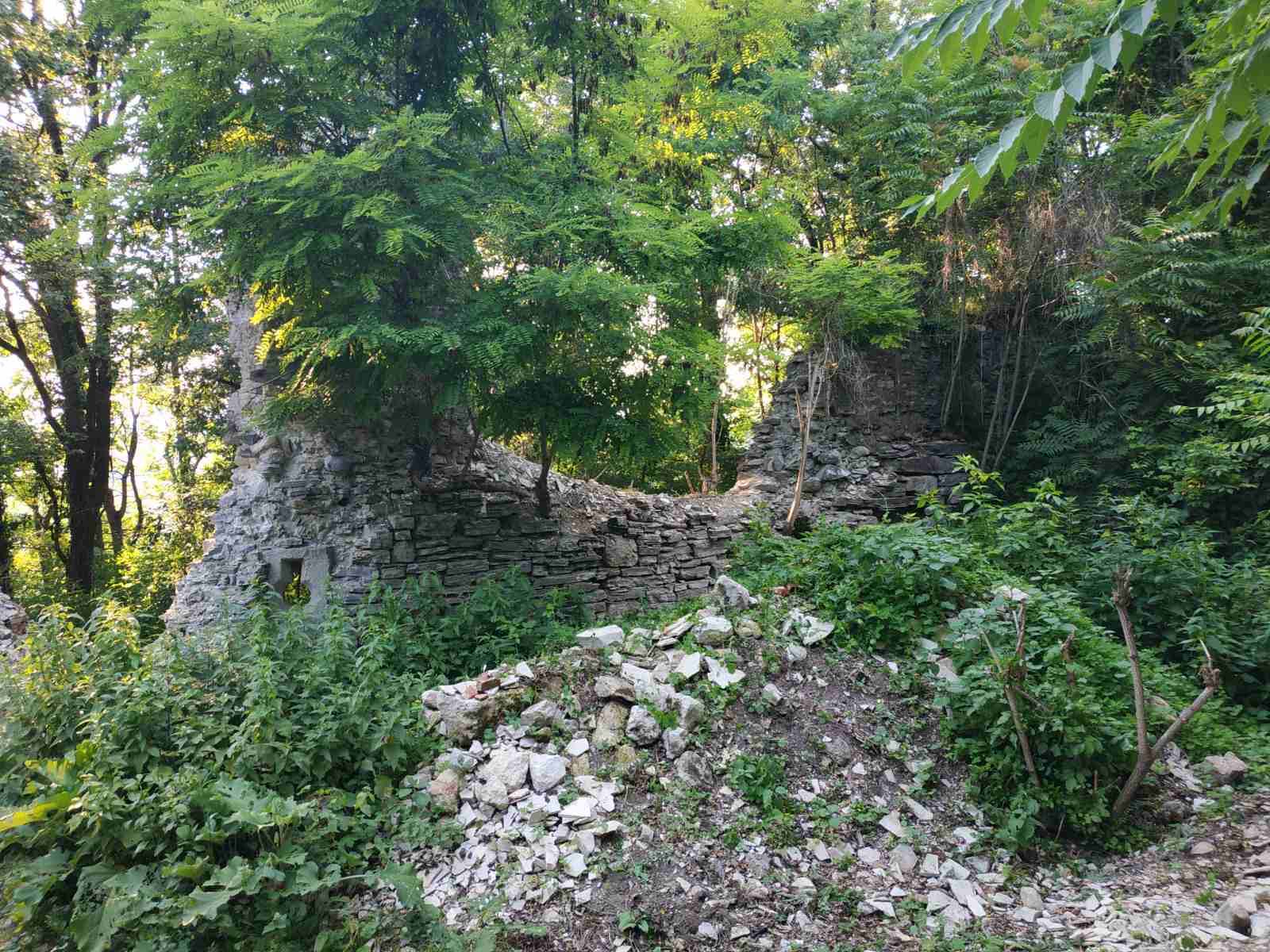
Remains of castle walls.

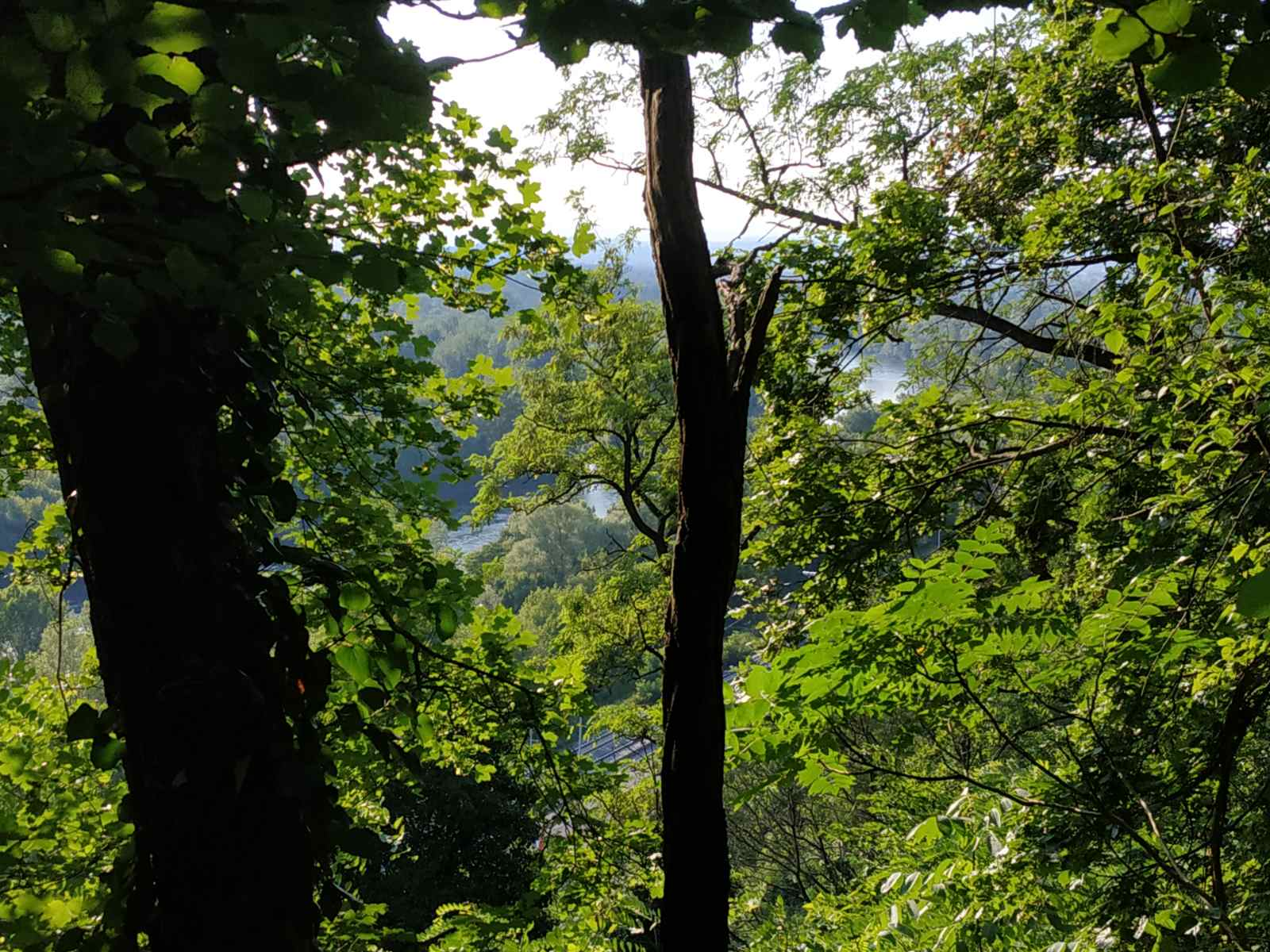
View towards Sava river.

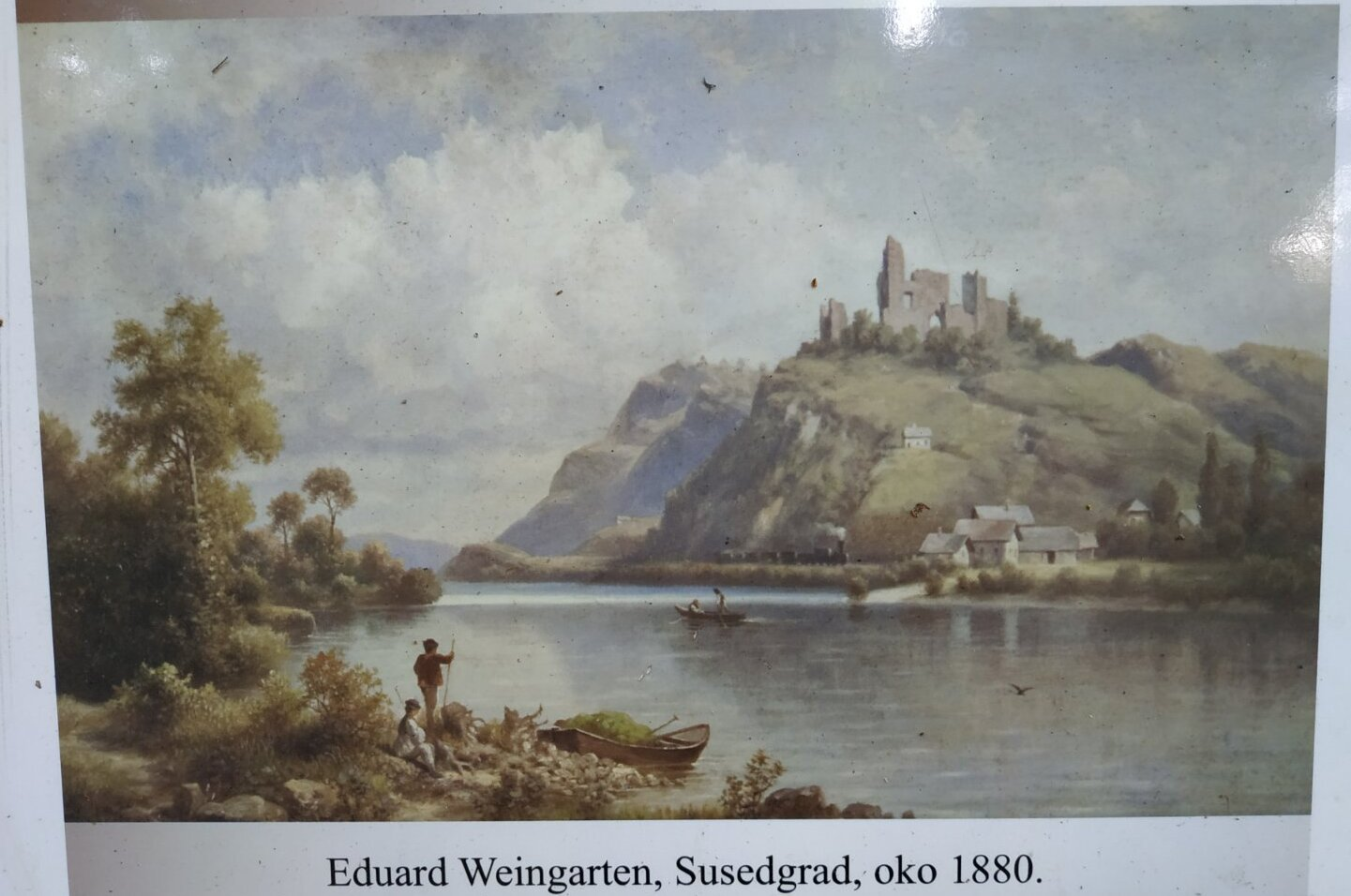
Susedgrad ruins on Eduard Weingarten's painting from around 1880.

== See also ==
- Novi Dvori of Zaprešić

== Bibliography ==
- Toplak, Iva (2021-11-30) [defended 2021-09-28]. Inventarizacija vaskularne flore lokaliteta park-šuma Susedgrad [Inventory of vascular flora constrained to the Susedgrad park forest] (Thesis) (in Croatian). Zagreb: Agronomski fakultet Sveučilišta u Zagrebu.
