= Henning–Tahy conflict =

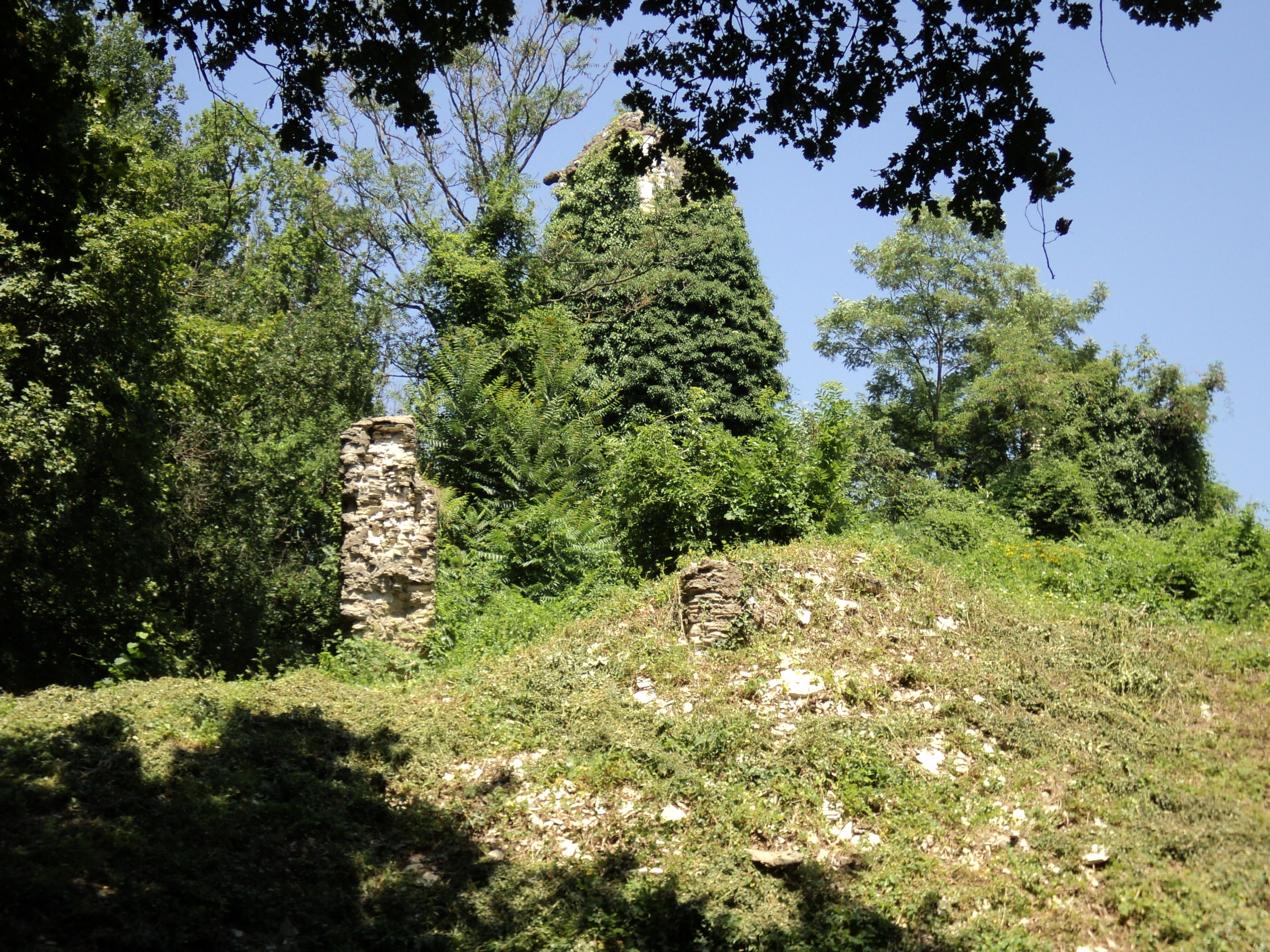
- Ruins of old Susedgrad Castle
| Date | 1564 – 1584 |
| Location | Susedgrad-Stubica Seigniory |
| Result | Croatian–Slovene Peasant Revolt; Hennings bought back Susedgrad castle in 1584 |

Belligerents
| Henning family, supported by: Gregorijanec Family; Szekely of Krapina local peasants | Tahy family, supported by: Alapić Family; Keglević family ban of Croatia |

Commanders and leaders
| Ursula Henning; Ambroz Gregorijanec; Ilija Gregorić; Matija Friščić; Nikola Kralić | Ferenc Tahy; Péter Erdődy; Matija Keglević; Šimun Keglević; Peter Ratkay; Ivan Alapić |

The Henning–Tahy conflict was a series of armed conflicts and legal disputes over the control of Susedgrad castle, in the early modern history of Croatia, at the time part of the Habsburg monarchy. It was fought between a faction centered around Ursula Meknitzer Henning and a faction centered around Ferenc Tahy. Throughout their strife for the possession of this castle, the rival nobles also attempted to incite its rival's peasants against their own master, which was one of the causes for major Croatian–Slovene Peasant Revolt in 1573.

== Background ==
Susedgrad was an important castle on western banks of Medvednica mountain. The castle served as an overwatch over the trade route along the Sava river valley, where feudal lords on nearby river crossings (Croatian: malta) charged traders tolls for going across. It was originally built somewhere between the 13th and 14th century. The castle changed hands several times. In 1564, one of the owners, Andras Bathory, sold his share of the possession to Franjo Tahy as he never was in Susedgrad anyway, due to his service in Hungary. This caused a long conflict between Tahis and Hennings, who owned the remaining share of the possession.

Knowing that this partial sale of Susedgrad to Tahy might upset the remaining owners, Tahy was secretly brought to Susedgrad by royal representative and Kaptol deputy. Upon finding out about this, the remaining owners led by Ursula Henning became very upset and protested against Tahy's arrival, saying that the whole process was illegal. According to historian Krivošić, Ursula actually had the right of first purchase but the ruler ignored the law because of Tahy’s wartime merits. Tahy also refused to give in to Ursula, and attempted to use his good family connections to win his case.

== Conflicts ==
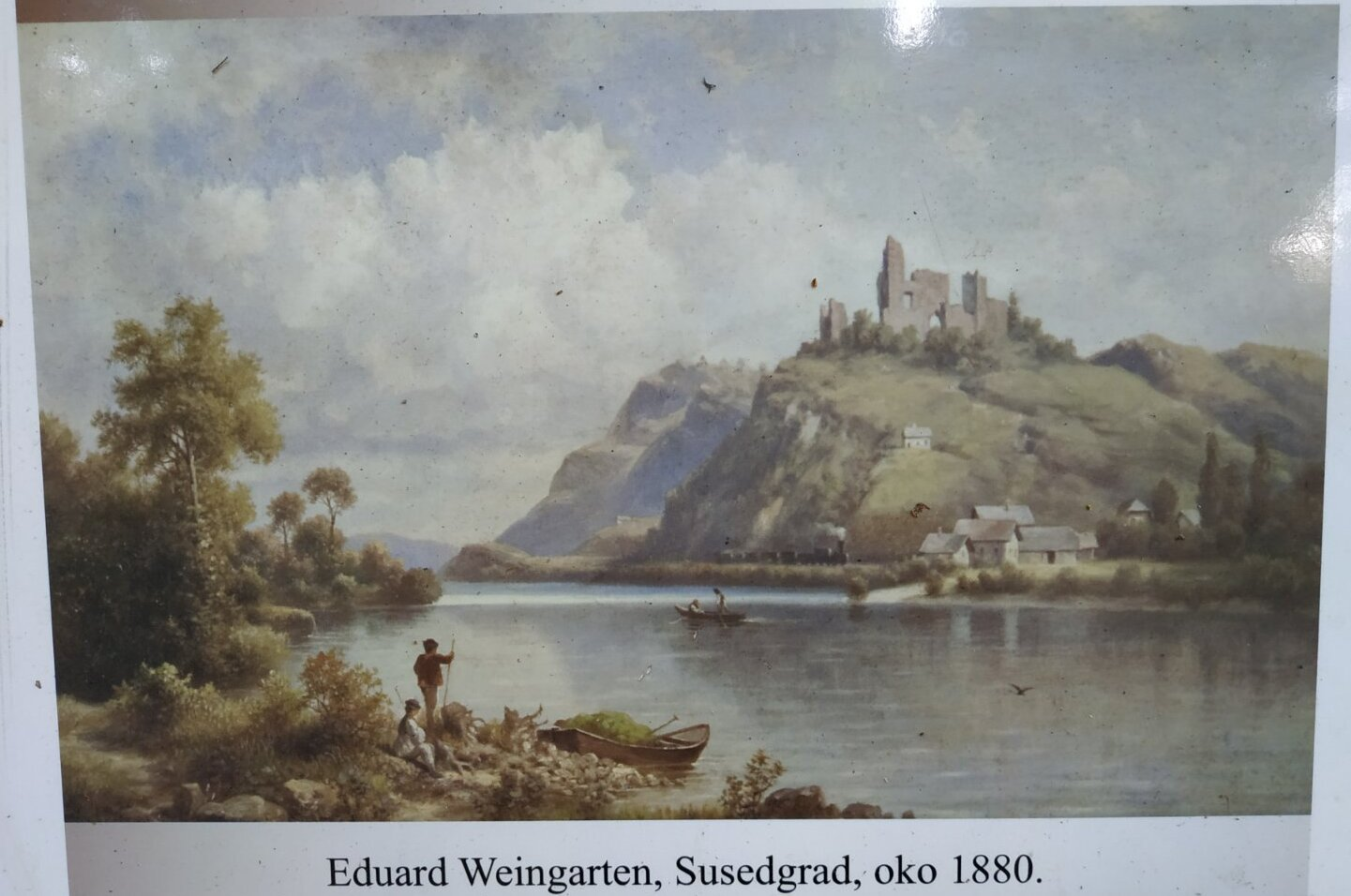
Late 19th century picture of Susedgrad castle ruins, with the Sava river before them.

=== Tahy asserts power ===
Once moved in, Tahy had Ursula and her family completely isolated from the outside world. He deployed 40 of his soldiers to hold Hennings hostage inside. Tahy also started his cruel treatment of local peasants and forbade them to make contact with Ursula. Ursula then complained to the king about Tahy's behaviour, but without much success.

=== Hennings expel Tahys ===
In 1565, when Tahy was away fighting the Ottomans in Hungary, Ursula Henning assembled the 800 strong army of local peasants, who then came to Susedgrad and purged Tahy's family out and looted their possessions worth 25,000 Forints. Tahy then complained to the ruler, but Ursula refused to obey his orders. Upon learning of a violent Henning takeover, the ban of Croatia, Peter Erdody, assembled his own army and marched them off to Susedgrad in order to punish Ursula and re-install Tahys back to their possession.

=== The Battle of Susedgrad ===
Upon learning this, Ursula's ally, Croatian viceban Ambroz Gregorijanec, along with other Henning family members again assembled a 3,000 strong peasant army. Hennings deployed their peasant army both inside the fortress and on nearby ambush positions. On 2 July 1565, the ban's army which consisted of a few hundred cavalrymen, a few hundred haramijas and three cannons arrived on the plains below Susedgrad castle. On the eve of July 3, Erdody's army approached close to Susedgrad and started bombarding it with cannon fire.

Henning's peasants who awaited in ambush, swiftly attacked the ban's army and in "short but bloody skirmish", killed many of Erdody's men, some of whom drowned in the Sava river while trying to flee. Throughout the battle, Henning's peasant army completely defeated the army of the Croatian ban and even managed to capture 3 cannons and the banner of the Croatian ban in the process. They also gravely wounded distinguished nobles such as Petar Keglević and Petar Ratkay, who had to be treated for their wounds in Zagreb. Although most of his army was annihilated near the castle, Erdody refused to withdraw completely, and went on to raid Susedgrad seigniory countryside.

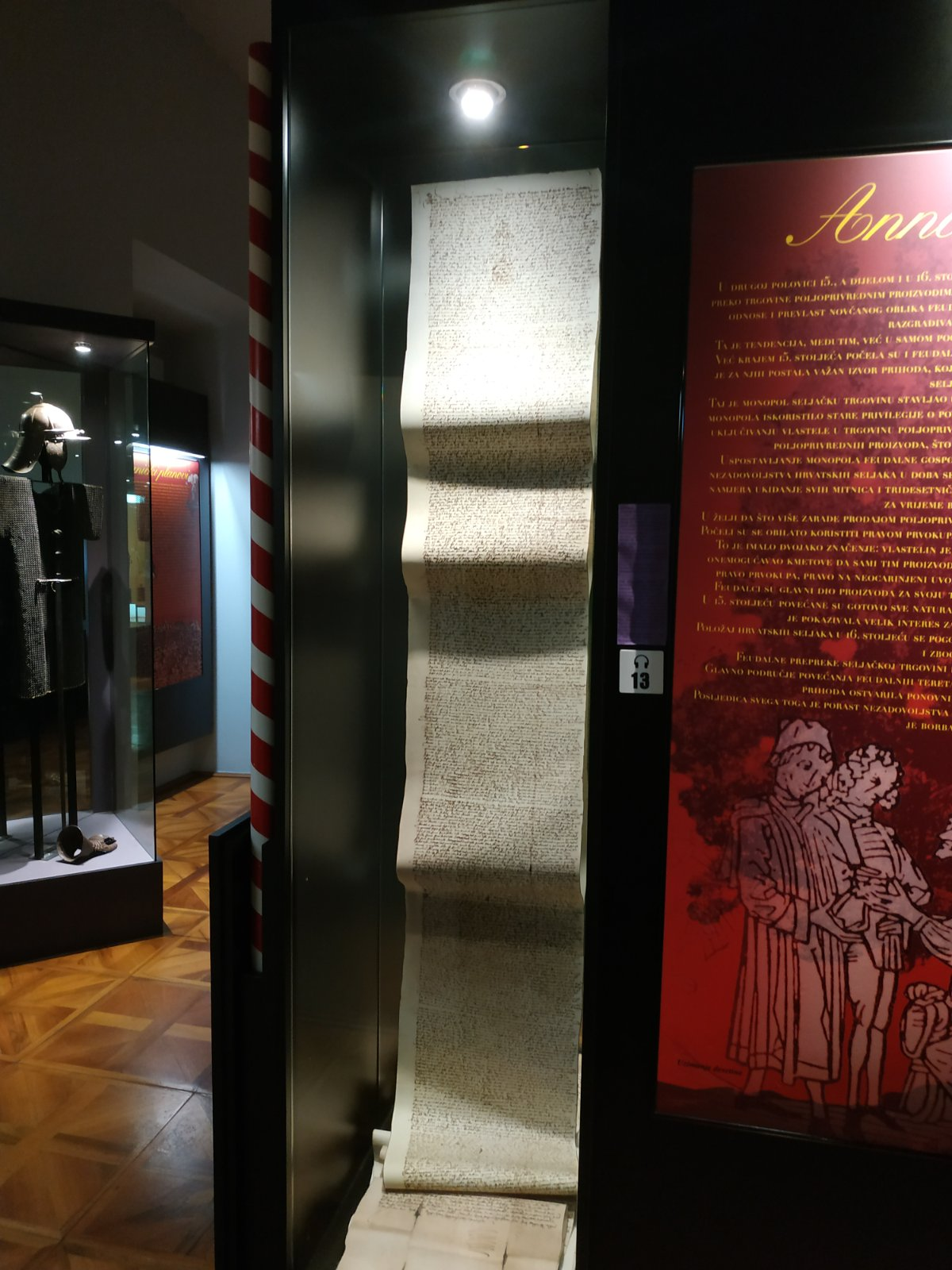
Copy of a six meter long list of complaints against Ferenc Tahy's behaviour.

=== Restoration of Tahy ===
Because of waging a battle against the state authorities, Gregorijanec was relieved of his position of viceban on Croatian sabor on 25 July 1566, while Ursula was trialed against. Tahy also forced Hennings to lay off their officials who assembled the peasant army and prepared the battle. In 1566, Tahy was again brought in on his half of Susedgrad-Stubica seigniory, while its remaining half was confiscated by Royal Chamber, until the court case against Ursula was resolved. Tahy used this opportunity to make his revenge against those peasants and officials who fought or sided with Ursula against him. His Henning adversaries also sent complaints of their own against Tahy to the king. Eventually, the investigation was launched, and it was concluded with a giant, six meters long list of accusations for all sorts of brutalities against Tahy, since lots of witnesses spoke against him. The investigation also further sparked the peasant movement against Tahy.

While Ursula was banned from Susedgrad by the state because she fought a battle against the ban's army in 1566, Tahy's continuous and constant strifes with the peasants on his estate culminated in the Croatian-Slovene Peasant Revolt of 1573. Soon after the revolt was crushed, Tahy died in 1573.

== End of the conflict ==
In 1584, the Hennings bought again Tahy's part of the estate for price of 44,000 Forints, which had put an end to this years long conflict.

== In popular culture ==
- 1565 Battle of Susedgrad was described in August Šenoa's 1877 novel Seljačka buna.

== Sources ==
- Enciklopedija Hrvatskog zagorja, Leksikografski zavod Miroslav Krleža, Zagreb, 2017.
- Klaić, Vjekoslav (1988). Povijest Hrvata (in Croatian). Vol. 5. Zagreb: Nakladni zavod Matice hrvatske.
