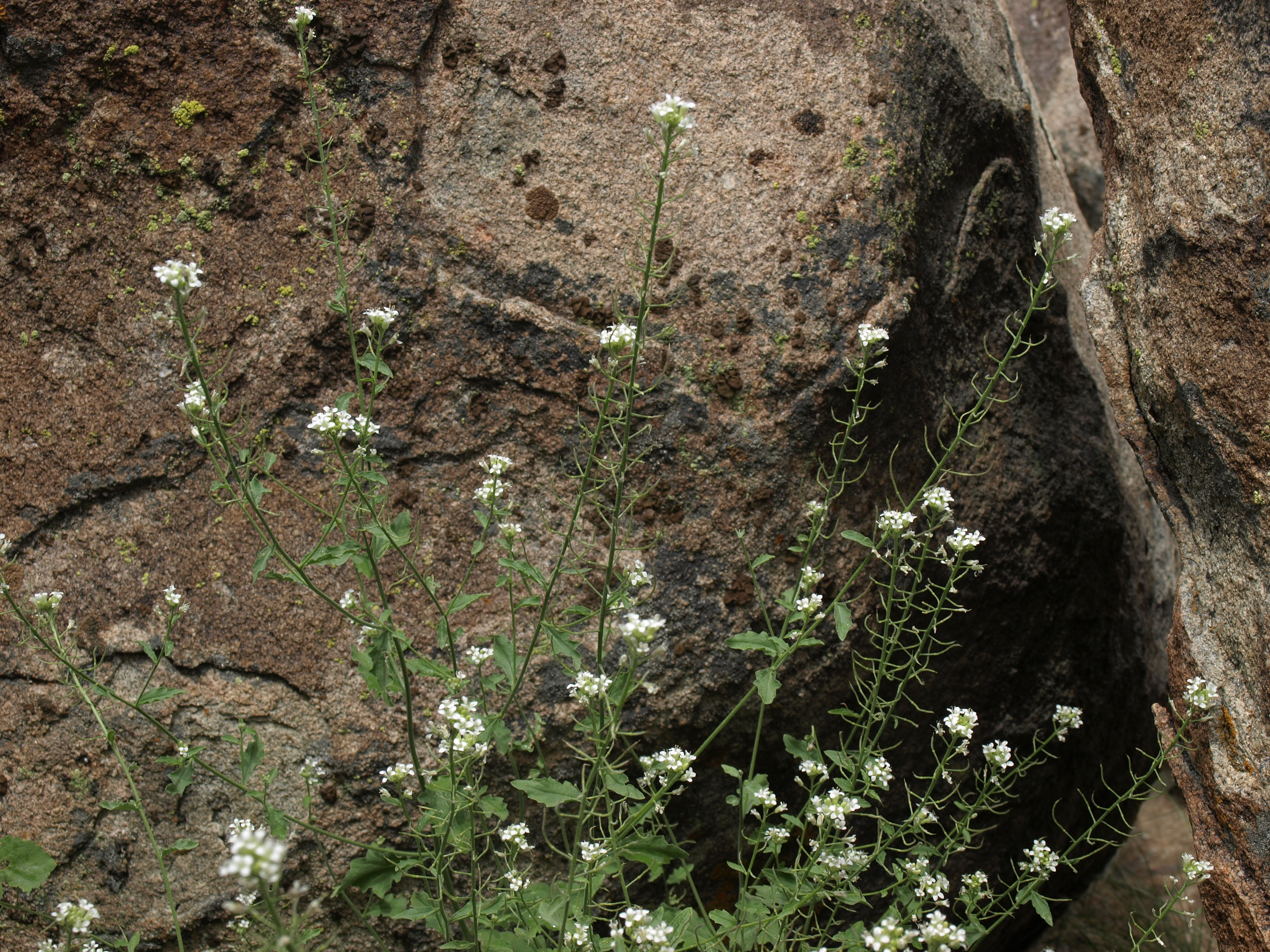
- Halimolobos jaegeri

Conservation status
- Vulnerable (NatureServe)

Scientific classification
- Kingdom: Plantae
- Clade: Tracheophytes
- Clade: Angiosperms
- Clade: Eudicots
- Clade: Rosids
- Order: Brassicales
- Family: Brassicaceae
- Genus: Halimolobos
- Species: H. jaegeri

Binomial name
- Halimolobos jaegeri (Munz) Rollins

= Halimolobos jaegeri =

Species of flowering plant

Halimolobos jaegeri is a species of flowering plant in the family Brassicaceae known by the common names Mojave fissurewort, or Mojave halimolobos. It is native to the Mojave Desert and nearby mountain ranges of California and Nevada. It grows in rocky areas, such as the limestone cliffs and slopes of the desert mountains.

This is a slightly woolly perennial plant growing many branching herbaceous stems to 20 to 60 centimetres (7.9 to 23.6 in) in height. The slender erect stems bear occasional lobed, ruffled leaves up to 6 centimetres (2.4 in) long. At the tips of stem branches are dense, fuzzy inflorescences of small white-petalled flowers with six protruding stamens. The fruit is a hairy silique one or two centimetres (0.4 or 0.8 in) long containing many tiny seeds.
