= Ferenc Tahy =

Hungarian-Croatian nobleman

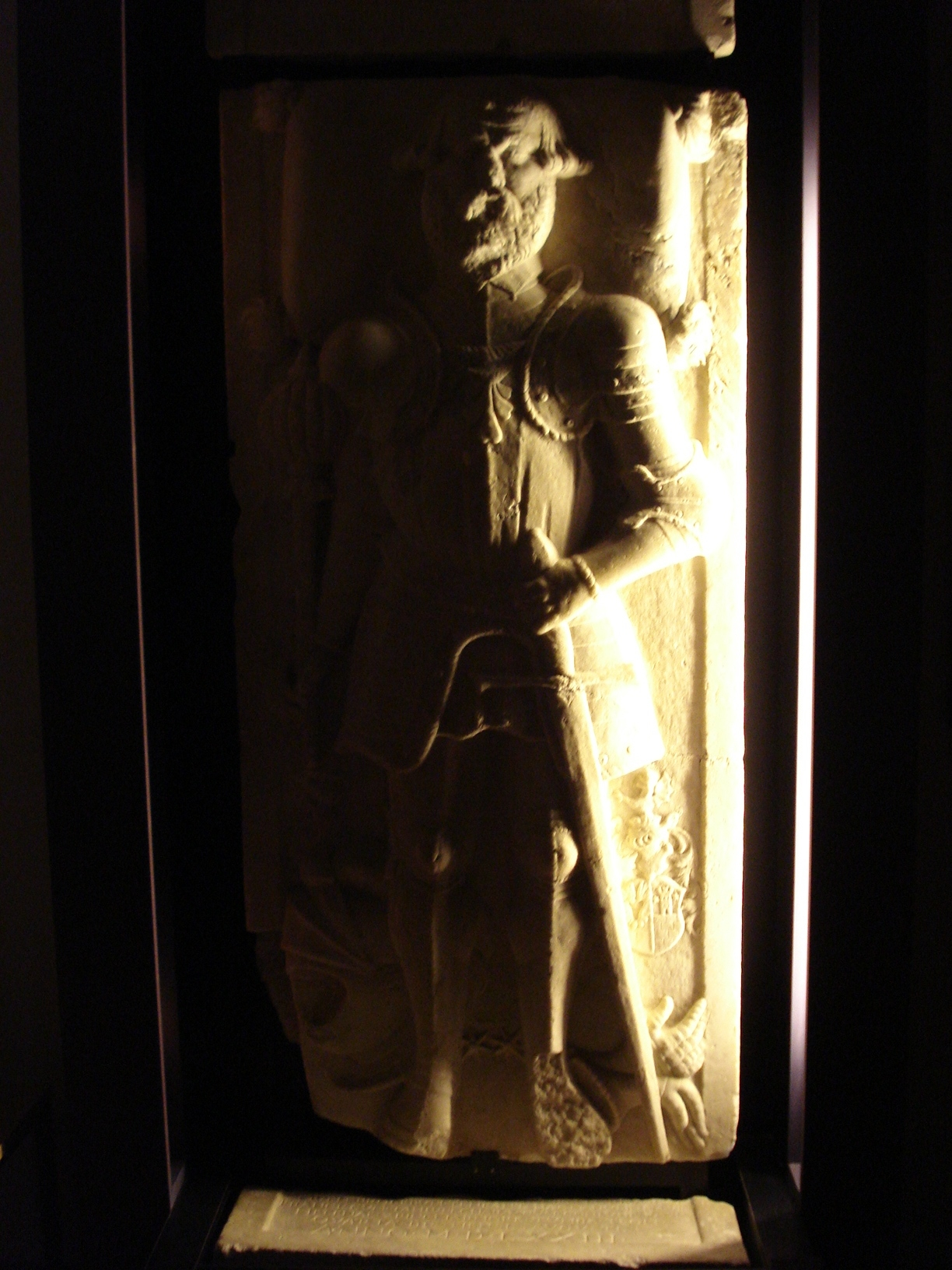
- Tahy's tomb relief, depicting himself.

Master of the horse
- Reign: 1553–1573
- Predecessor: Ferenc Nyáry
- Successor: László Bánffy
- Born: 1526
- Died: 3 October 1573 (aged 46–47); Susedgrad
- Buried: Church of Holy Trinity, Donja Stubica
- Wars and battles: Siege of Szigetvar; Henning-Tahy Wars; Croatian-Slovene Peasant Revolt
- Noble family: House of Tahy
- Spouse: Jelena Zrinski
- Issue: Gábor
- Father: János Tahy

Ferenc Tahy de Tahvár et Tarkő, (also known as Franjo Tahi, or Tahy in Croatian and as Ferenc Tahi in Slovenian; 1526–1573) was a Hungarian–Croatian nobleman from the Tahy family, which draws its origins from Pilis County. He was known to have held the positions of royal adviser and master of the horse. His cruel treatment of serfs was one of the causes of Croatian–Slovene Peasant Revolt.

== Family ==
His father János Tahy held the title of Ban of Croatia in 1524, and died when Ferenc was 10 years old. He was married to Jelena, the sister of famous Croatian nobleman and war general Nikola IV Zrinski. His daughter Margareta was married to Péter Erdődy, ban of Croatia from 1556 to 1567. Tahy also had a son named Gábor.

== Biography ==
Tahy distinguished himself in the wars against the Ottoman Turks, for which he was appointed commander of the royal army in southern Hungary as well as the commander of strongholds in Szigetvár and Kanizsa. After his estates in Slavonia and Hungary were seized by the Ottomans in 1556, he acquired new estates in Stattenberg, Styria and in 1564, one half of the Susedgrad-Stubica seigniory, the former estate of the Báthory family. This acquisition brought him into confrontation with the Henning family who owned the other half of the Susedgrad-Stubica seigniory. In 1565, using the help of local peasants, the Hennings drove out Tahy and his family and defeated the viceroy's army that was sent there to help the Tahys reclaim their new estates. The seigniory was soon confiscated by the Hungarian Royal Chamber. Tahy confronted the Chamber's manager, which resulted in the leasing of the seigneury back to Tahy in 1569. Soon after, a series of rebellions broke out there. According to Croatian historian Vjekoslav Klaić, Tahy was a Protestant.

== Role in Croatian-Slovene Peasant Revolt ==
Ferenc Tahy's treatment of Croatian peasants was traditionally known as the key factor which led to the Croatian-Slovene Peasant revolt, although modern historiography emphasizes other causes as crucial factors that caused the rebellion, most notably economic ones. Historian Branko Čičko considers that Tahy did not treat his subjects any worse than other feudal lords of that period and that his negative image was constructed during the 19th century as a personification of bad Hungarians in Croatian national history. In explaining what caused the revolt, he instead points to struggles for the seigniory ownership and malversations of royal official Stjepan Grdak.

== Death ==
After the rebellion was crushed, Tahy was seriously ill. At that point he ordered himself a tombstone which is kept today in Museum of The Peasant Rebellion of 1573 at Castle Oršić, Stubica, Croatia. Upon his death, Tahy was buried in the church of the Holy Trinity in Donja Stubica. According to story told by a curator of Museum of Peasant Revolts in Gornja Stubica, in Croatian TV show Hrvatski velikani, Tahy's grave was kicked out of church where he was originally buried - by the order of local priest - because infertile village women came to worship Tahy's relief hoping that it would make them fertile again. The relief was subsequently conserved in Museum of Peasant Revolts.

== In popular culture ==
Tahy was portrayed by Serbian actor Pavle Vuisić in Yugoslav/Croatian historical war movie Anno Domini 1573.

Croatian heavy metal band Podne Rogato made a song named "Franjo Tahi" dedicated to him.

== Gallery ==
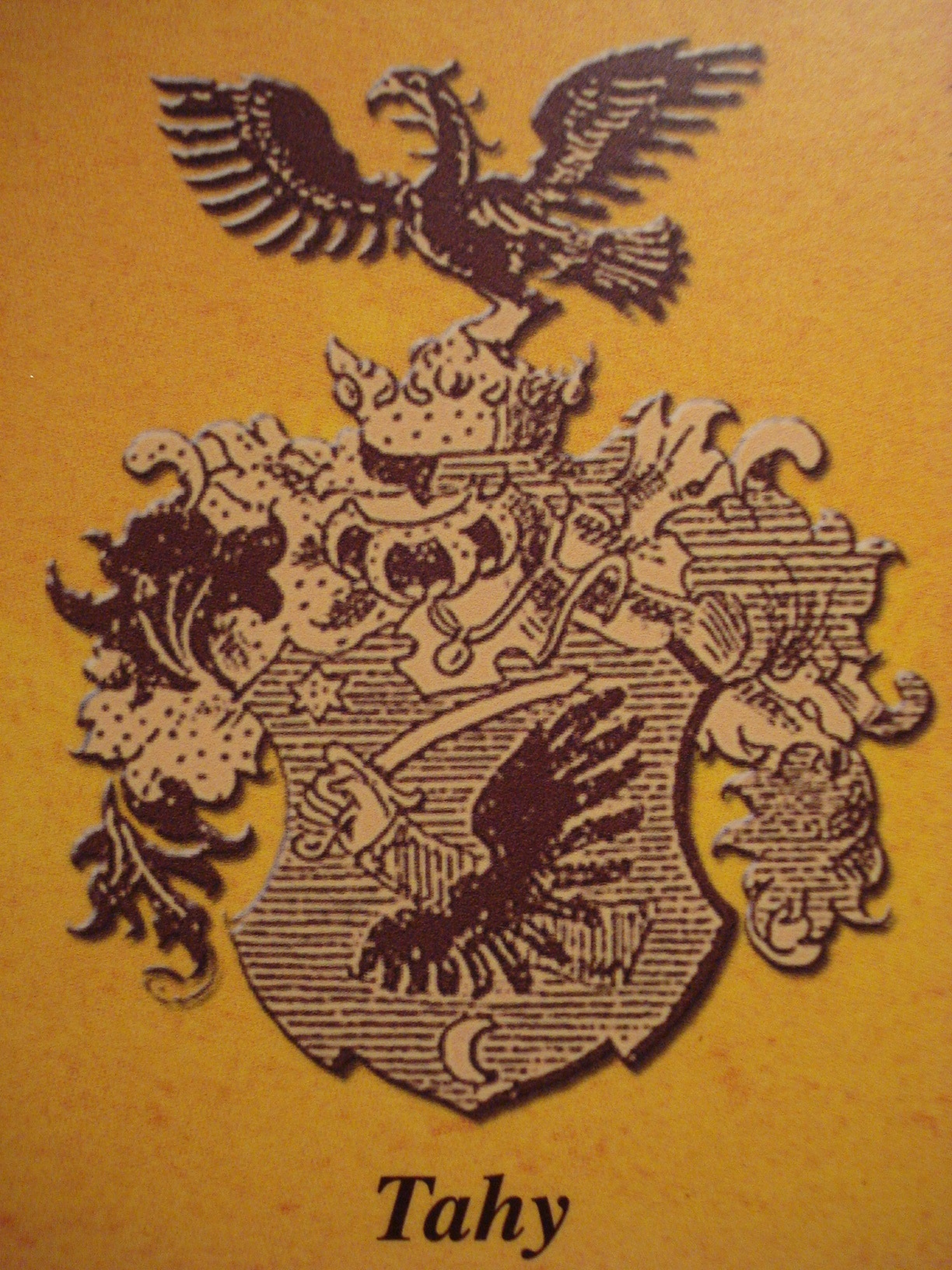
Coat of Arms of Tahy family

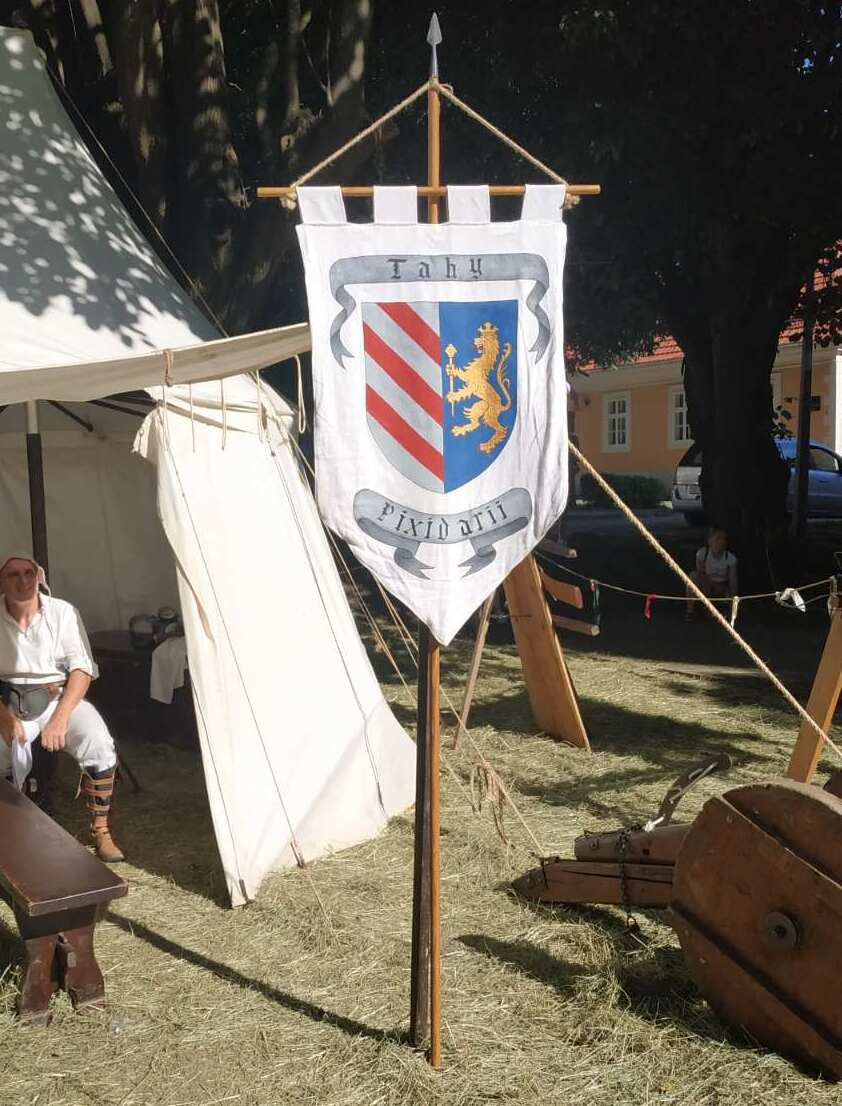
Recreation of apparent Tahy flag on Medieval reenactment in Donja Stubica in 2022.
