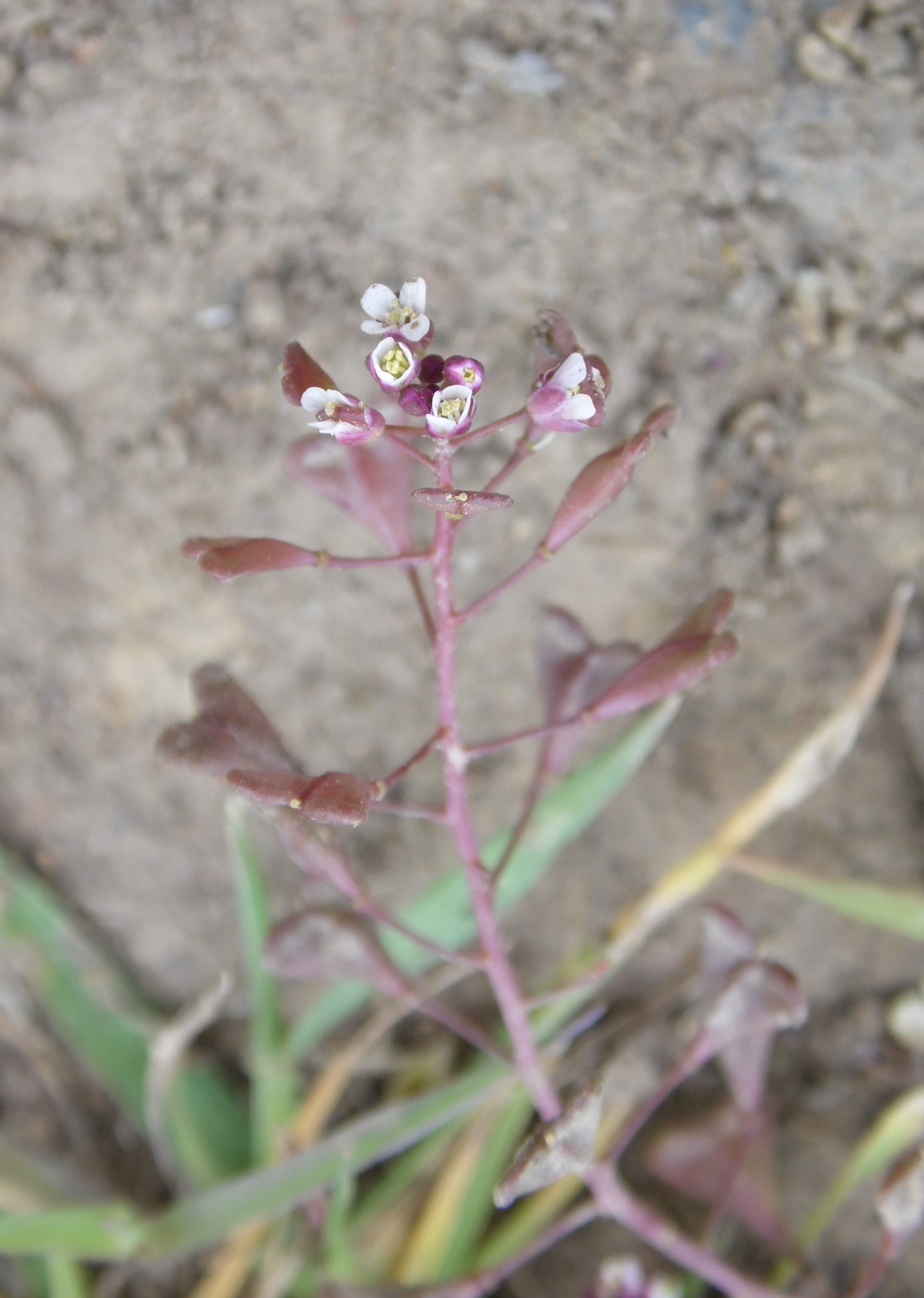

Scientific classification
- Kingdom: Plantae
- Clade: Embryophytes
- Clade: Tracheophytes
- Clade: Angiosperms
- Clade: Eudicots
- Clade: Rosids
- Order: Brassicales
- Family: Brassicaceae
- Genus: Capsella
- Species: C. rubella

Binomial name
- Capsella rubella Reut.

= Capsella rubella =

Species of flowering plant

Capsella rubella, the pink shepherd's-purse, is a plant species in the genus Capsella, and a member of the mustard family. It has a very similar appearance to C. bursa-pastoris, but C. rubella has a diploid as opposed to a tetraploid genome. The species is also a very close relative of Arabidopsis thaliana.

The separation of C. rubella from its closest ancestor (connecting it to C. grandiflora) is theorized to have happened around 30,000 to 50,000 years ago. Along with C. grandiflora, it is used as a model plant to study the evolution of self-incompatibility into self-compatibility in plant reproduction.

The species is found mostly in the Mediterranean region.
