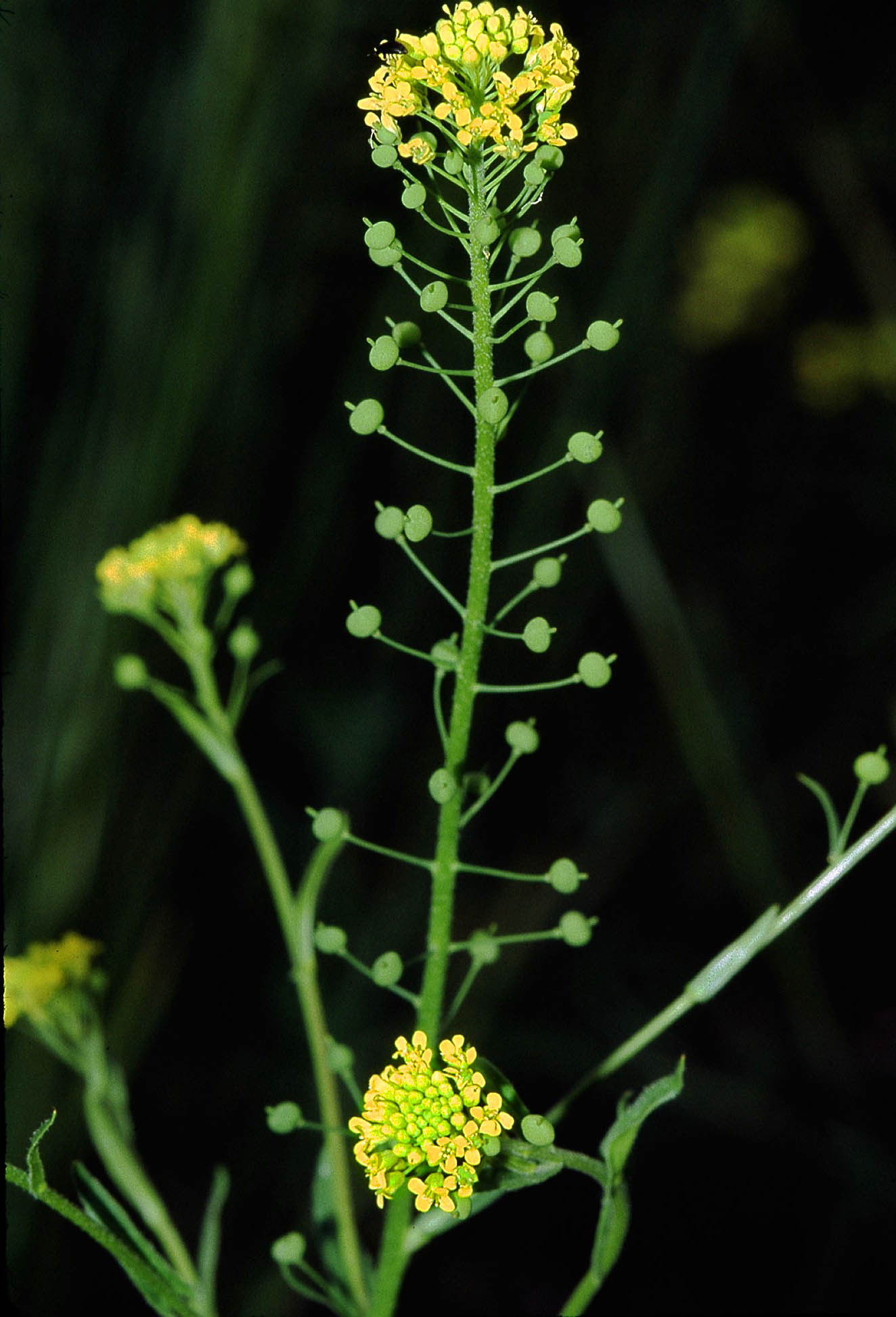

Scientific classification
- Kingdom: Plantae
- Clade: Embryophytes
- Clade: Tracheophytes
- Clade: Angiosperms
- Clade: Eudicots
- Clade: Rosids
- Order: Brassicales
- Family: Brassicaceae
- Genus: Neslia; Desv.
- Species: N. paniculata

Binomial name
- Neslia paniculata (L.) Desv.

Synonyms
- Myagrum paniculatum L.

= Neslia =

Genus of flowering plants

Neslia is a monotypic plant genus in the family Brassicaceae. The only species is Neslia paniculata (L.) Desv.

== Neslia paniculata ==
Neslia paniculata (commonly called ball mustard) is a plant species in the family Brassicaceae. The name comes from the ball-shaped fruits that contain a single seed within an indehiscent fruit coat. It is an annual where the seeds germinate in autumn to winter and grow into a flattened rosette of leaves that develop vertical flowering stems in the spring. These can be up to 1 metre tall. The flowers open in late spring/early summer and the seeds are mature by summer.

It is a native plant of temperate regions of Eurasia. It can also be found in much of the northern and southern regions of the Americas, Australia and also Britain. It is considered a weed in many of these regions introduced from agricultural seed and can be a problem in cereal and especially other brassica crops. Its seed pods can contaminate harvests of mustard and rape/canola, even after cleaning. At the other end of the spectrum, within some its original region it has become a threatened or rare arable plant as a consequence of improved agricultural practices.

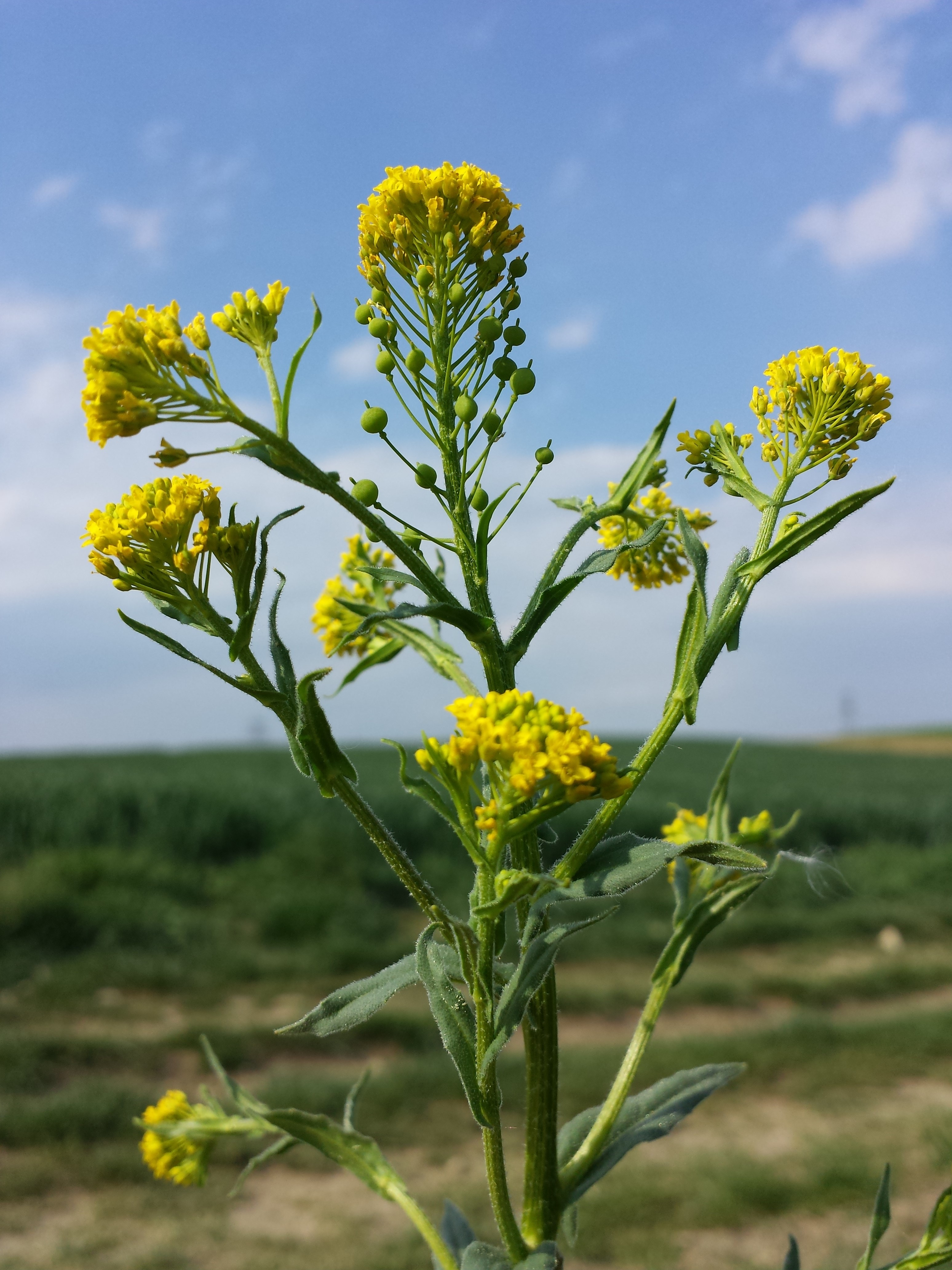

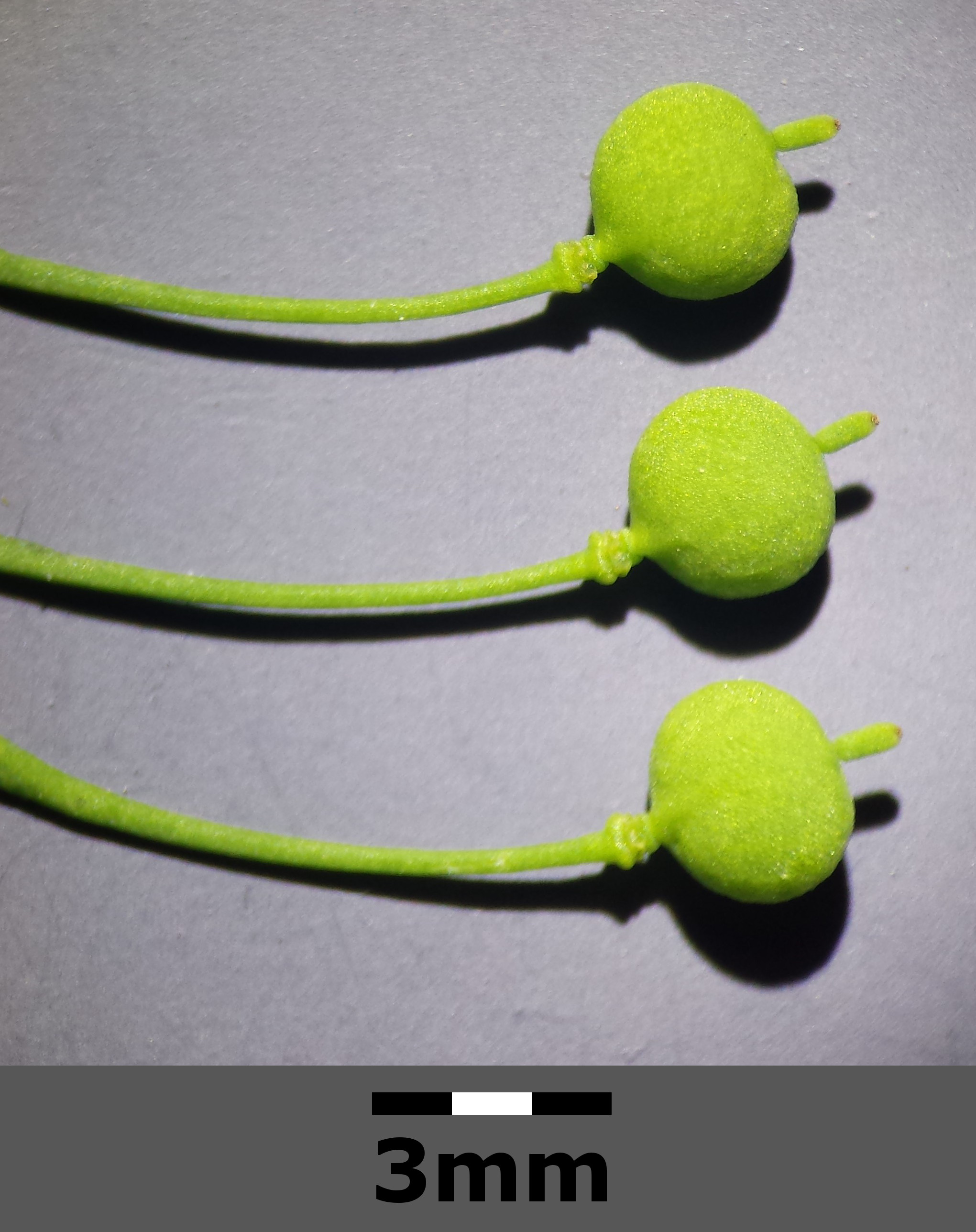

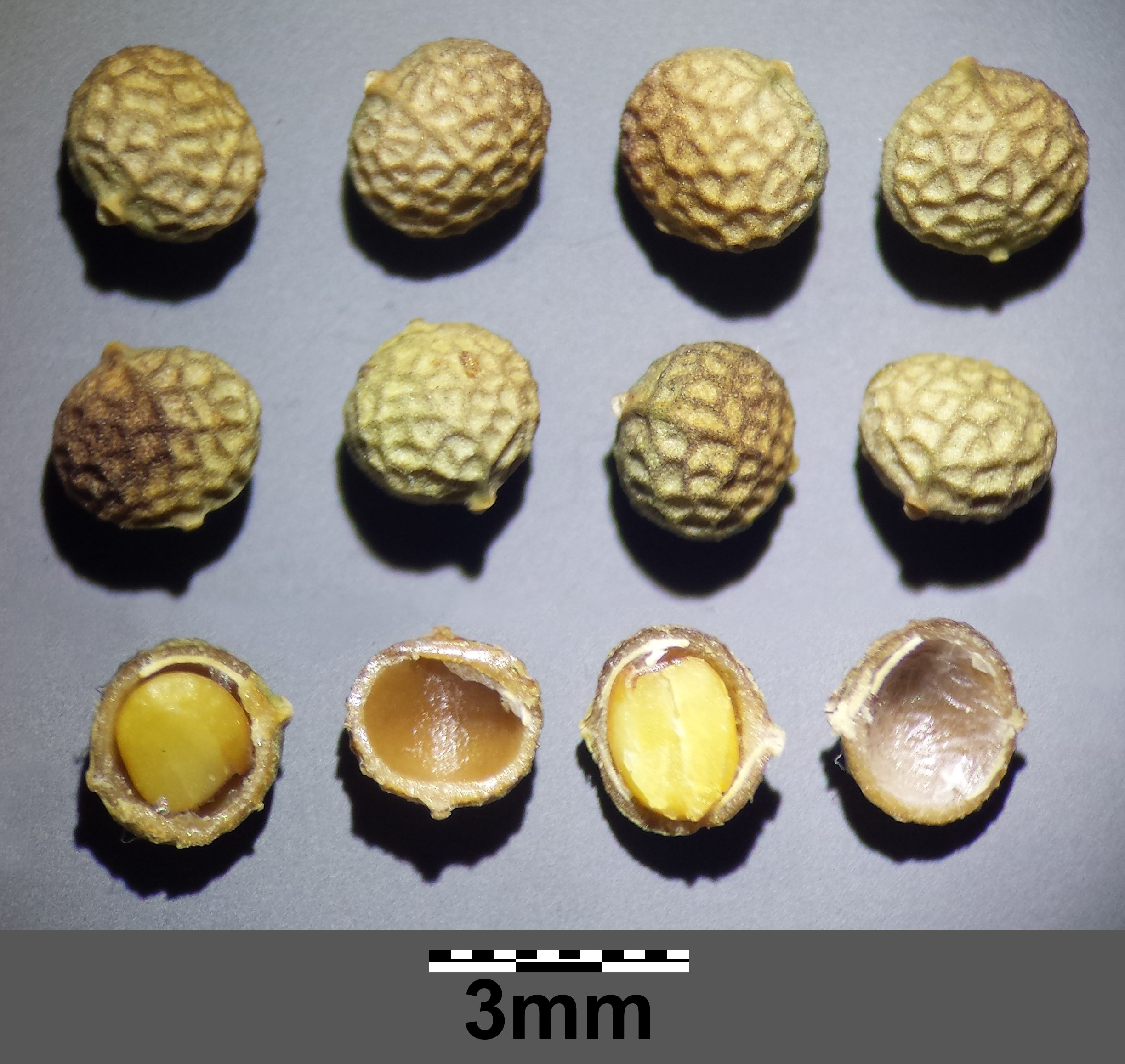
