= Capsella orientalis =

Scientific classification
- Kingdom: Plantae
- Clade: Tracheophytes
- Clade: Angiosperms
- Clade: Eudicots
- Clade: Rosids
- Order: Brassicales
- Family: Brassicaceae
- Genus: Capsella
- Species: C. orientalis

Binomial name
- Capsella orientalis Klokov

Species of flowering plant

Capsella orientalis is a plant species described by Mikhail Vasilevich Klokov. It is a part of the genus Capsella and the family Brassicaceae.
