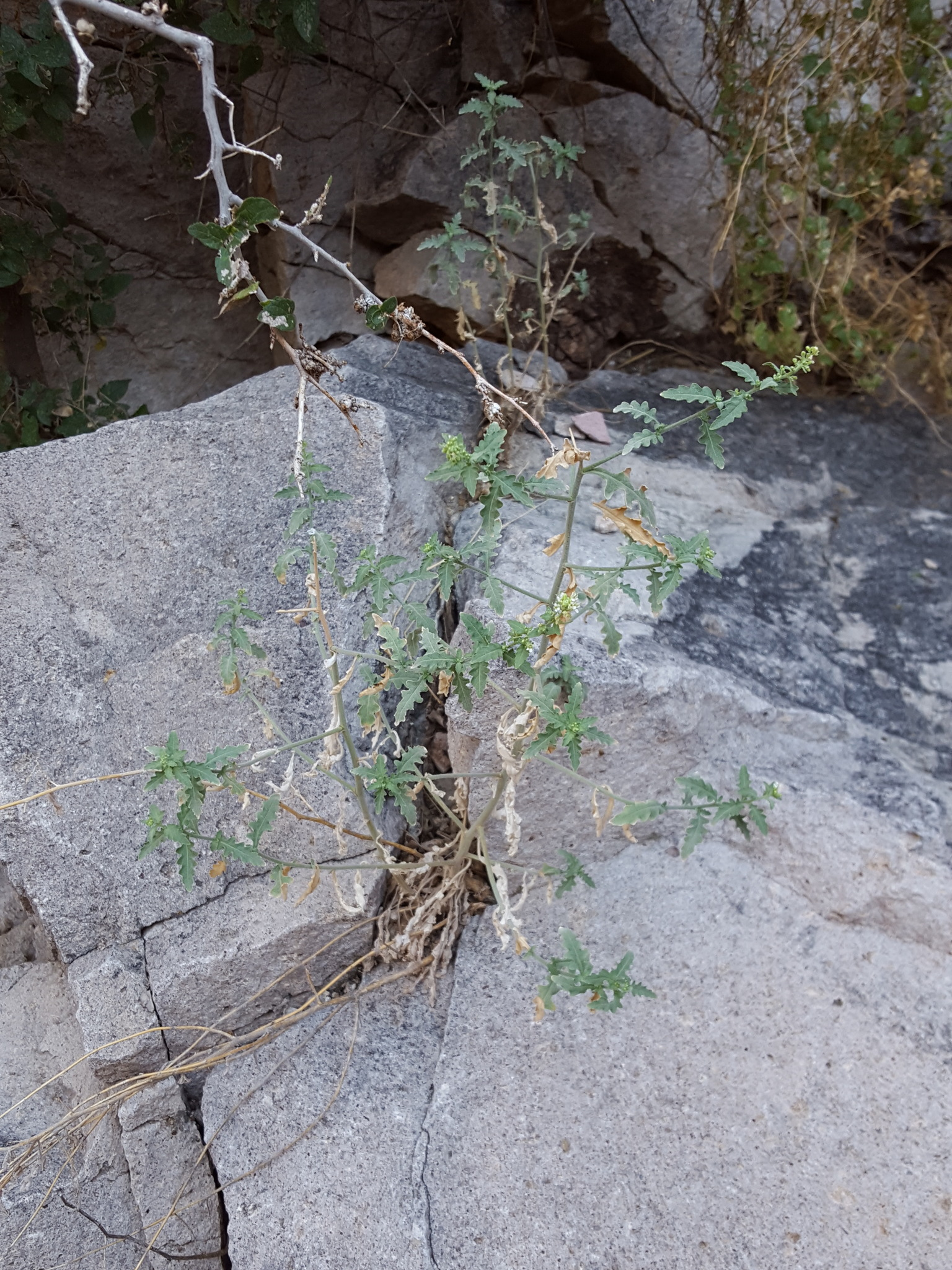
- Halimolobos diffusus in New Mexico, USA

Scientific classification
- Kingdom: Plantae
- Clade: Tracheophytes
- Clade: Angiosperms
- Clade: Eudicots
- Clade: Rosids
- Order: Brassicales
- Family: Brassicaceae
- Genus: Halimolobos; Tausch

Species
- 8; See text

Synonyms
- Poliophyton O.E.Schulz

= Halimolobos =

Genus of flowering plants

Halimolobos is a genus of flowering plants in the family Brassicaceae known generally as fissureworts. It includes eight species of biennial and perennial herbs which native to North America, from the southwestern and south-central United States to northeastern Mexico.

== Species ==
Eight species are accepted.

- Halimolobos diffusus (A.Gray) O.E.Schulz – spreading fissurewort
- Halimolobos elatus (Rollins) Al-Shehbaz & C.D.Bailey
- Halimolobos henricksonii (Rollins) Al-Shehbaz & C.D.Bailey
- Halimolobos jaegeri (Munz) Rollins – Mojave halimolobos
- Halimolobos lasiolobus (Link) O.E.Schulz
- Halimolobos multiracemosus (S.Watson) Rollins
- Halimolobos pubens (A.Gray) Al-Shehbaz & C.D.Bailey
- Halimolobos stylosus (Rollins) Al-Shehbaz & C.D.Bailey
