= Susedgrad-Stubica Seigniory =

Croatian Feudal Estate

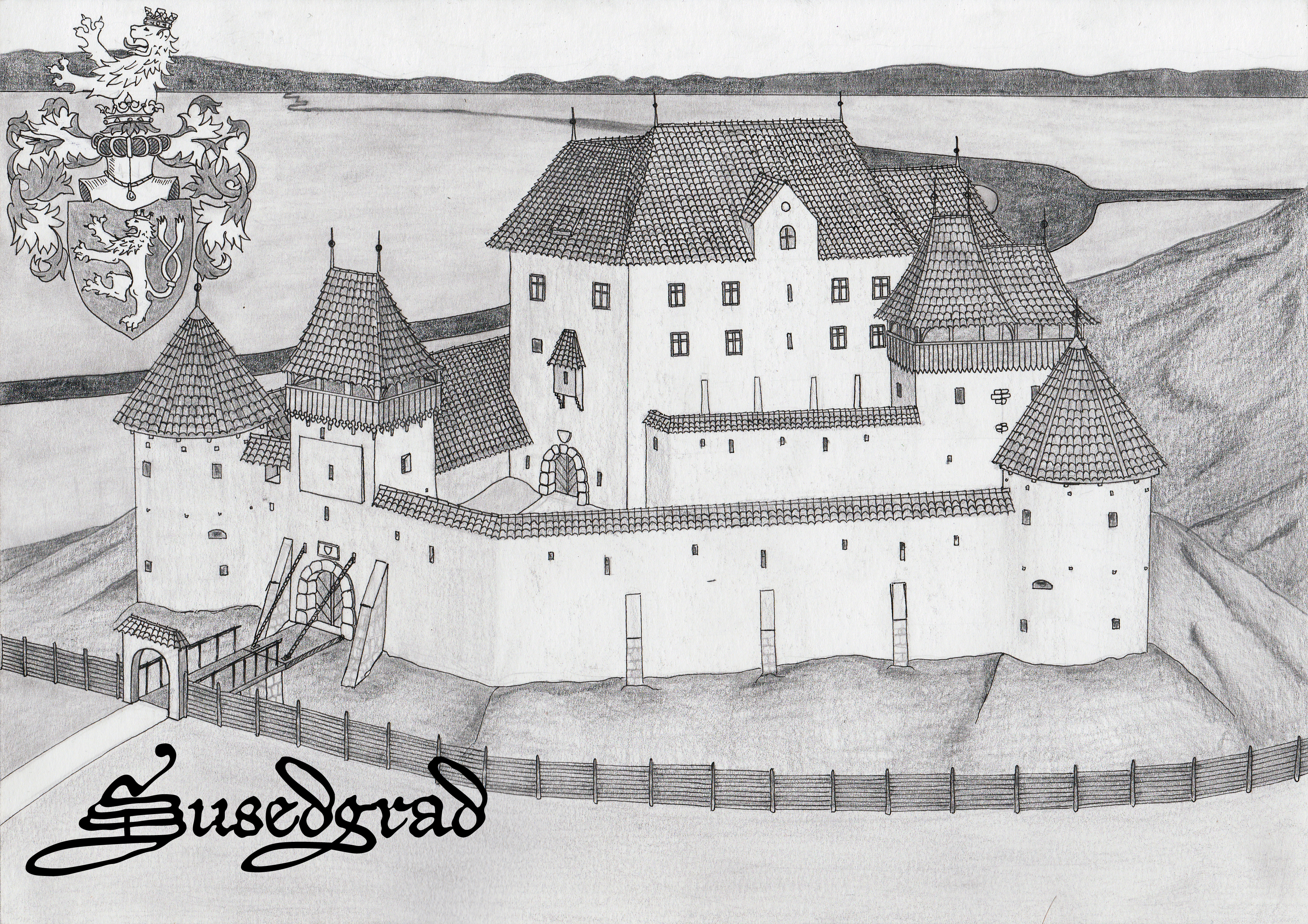
Reconstruction of Susedgrad Castle - the western centre of Susedgrad-Stubica Seigniory, with Sava and Krapina rivers visible behind.

Susedgrad-Stubica Seigniory was a medieval and early modern feudal estate on what is today Zagreb County, City of Zagreb and Krapina-Zagorje County.

== Estate borders ==
The estate's western borders spanned from Sutla-Sava confluence, following Sava river towards Strmec Samoborski, Novaki and Rakitje. It then followed Vrapčak creed towards Sava. From there it stretched across mount Medvedniva plains to Poljanica Bistranska and across Gornja Stubica towards Bedekovčina. The estate's northern border spanned from Krapina towards Luka, and northwestwards towards Merenje and Oplaznik, eventually again reaching Sutla river. The estate was centered around two castles – Susedgrad and Stubica. Due to castle Susedgrad's excellent location, the it served as an overwatch of Sava river and road Ljubljana-Sisak. Near Podsused, there was a river crossing point, where local lords charged for crossing the water and controlled the goods entering on the estate.

== History ==
The estate was formed after Aka family's possessions were divided into two parts in 1340 and 1342. The first, smaller part encompassed Gornja Stubica part and belonged to the Gornja Stubica branch of the aforementioned family, while the second, larger part belonged to the Susedgrad branch, who adopted the name "Toths of Susedgrad". This family branch regained Susedgrad fort in 1345 from King Louis I of Hungary, Louis The Great, after which they gained control over Slani Potok and Donja Stubica. They soon gained control over lands between rivers Krapina and Sutla then known as Zakrapina, which gained the estate its final shape. In the early 16th century, the estate was one of the largest in northwestern Croatia. By the year 1560, the estate had some 1400 inhabitants. Throughout times, various nobles held ownership over the estate. In 1573, the estate was the epicentre of the Croatian-Slovene Peasant Revolt led by Ambroz Gubec, which was subsequently crushed.

By dividing Susedgrad-Stubica Seigniory in 1574, the process of its dissolution and particularization into smaller estates began. Eventually, the estate decomposed into some 20 smaller manors which all became separate entities.
