= William Coles (botanist) =

William Coles (1626–1662), botanist, also known as William Cole, was born in 1626 at Adderbury, Oxfordshire, being the son of John Cole. He is known for the doctrine of signatures of medicinal herbs or 'simples', whereby the plant has some attribute which shows the botanist what its use may be.

== Biography ==
He entered New College, Oxford, in 1642, and was soon after made a postmaster of Merton College, Oxford by his mother's brother, John French, senior fellow and registrar of the university. He graduated B.A. on 18 February 1650, having become a public notary, and having already devoted much attention to botany. He afterwards resided at Putney, 'where he became the most famous simpler or herbalist of his time' He became B.D. and fellow of New College and in 1660 was made secretary to Brian Duppa, bishop of Winchester, in whose service he died in 1662.

== Works ==
His works are:

1. The Art of Simpling, or an Introduction to the Knowledge and Gathering of Plants, London, 1656, pp. 123, 12mo, with which was bound the next book, 2. Perspicillum Microcosmologicum, or a Prospective for the Discovery of the Lesser World. Wherein Man is in a Compendium, theologically, philosophically, and anatomically described, and compared with the Universe.

3. Adam in Eden, or Nature's Paradise. The History of Plants, Herbs, Flowers, with their several, . . names, whether Greek, Latin, or English, and . . . vertues, London, 1657, pp. 629, folio.

His name, given by Wood, Rose, and others as Cole, appears as Coles on the title-pages of both his works.
