= Jean Charles Marie Grenier =

French botanist and naturalist

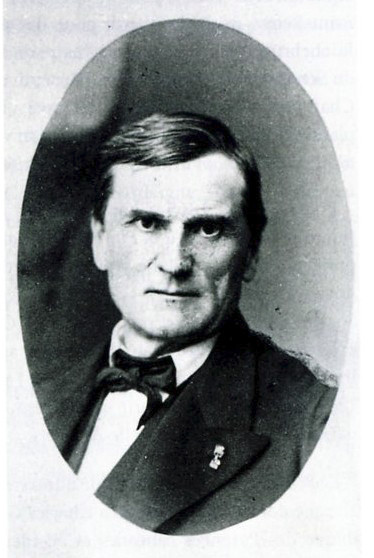
Charles Grenier

Jean Charles Marie Grenier (French pronunciation: [ʒɑ̃ ʃaʁl maʁi ɡʁənje]; 1808–1875) was a French botanist and naturalist who was a professor to the Faculty of Sciences at Besançon.

In 1836 he received his doctorate in medicine, followed by his degree in sciences in 1844. At Besançon, he taught classes in natural history, zoology and botany, being appointed doyen of the school in 1869.

Grenier is credited with the description of hundreds of botanical species, many of them in collaboration with Dominique Alexandre Godron (1807–1880), a professor of natural history at Nancy. With Prof. Godron he published a three-volume work on French flora called Flore de France (1848–1856). Grenier was also author of Flore de la châine jurassique (Flora of the Jura Mountain chain) (1865–69).
