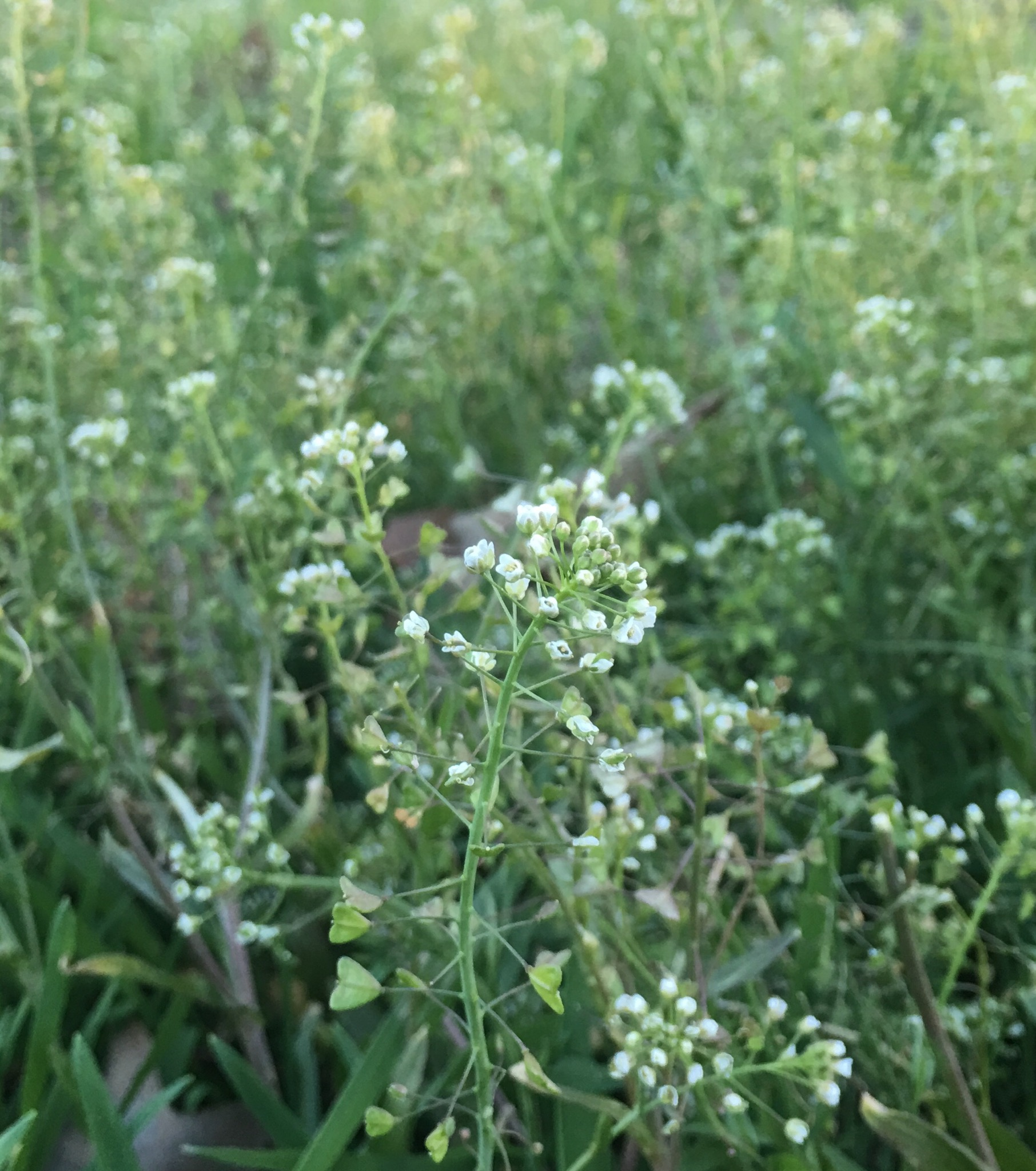
- Flowering and fruiting

Scientific classification
- Kingdom: Plantae
- Clade: Tracheophytes
- Clade: Angiosperms
- Clade: Eudicots
- Clade: Rosids
- Order: Brassicales
- Family: Brassicaceae
- Genus: Capsella
- Species: C. bursa-pastoris

Binomial name
- Capsella bursa-pastoris (L.) Medik.

Subspecies
- C. bursa-pastoris subsp. bursa-pastoris; C. bursa-pastoris subsp. thracicus (Velen.) Stoj. & Stef.

Synonyms
- List: Bursa bursa-pastoris (L.) Shafer; Nasturtium bursa-pastoris (L.) Roth; Rodschiedia bursa-pastoris (L.) G.Gaertn., B.Mey. & Scherb.; Thlaspi bursa-pastoris L.; Thlaspi bursa-pastoris subsp. pinnatifolia Ehrh.

= Capsella bursa-pastoris =

Shepherd's purse

Species of flowering plant in the mustard family

Capsella bursa-pastoris, commonly known as shepherd's purse or lady's purse, is a small flowering plant in the mustard family. It has been described as a protocarnivore because its seeds contain mucilage, which traps nematodes.

The plant is native to Eurasia but is naturalized and considered a common weed in many parts of the world, especially in colder climates. It has a number of culinary uses.

== Description ==
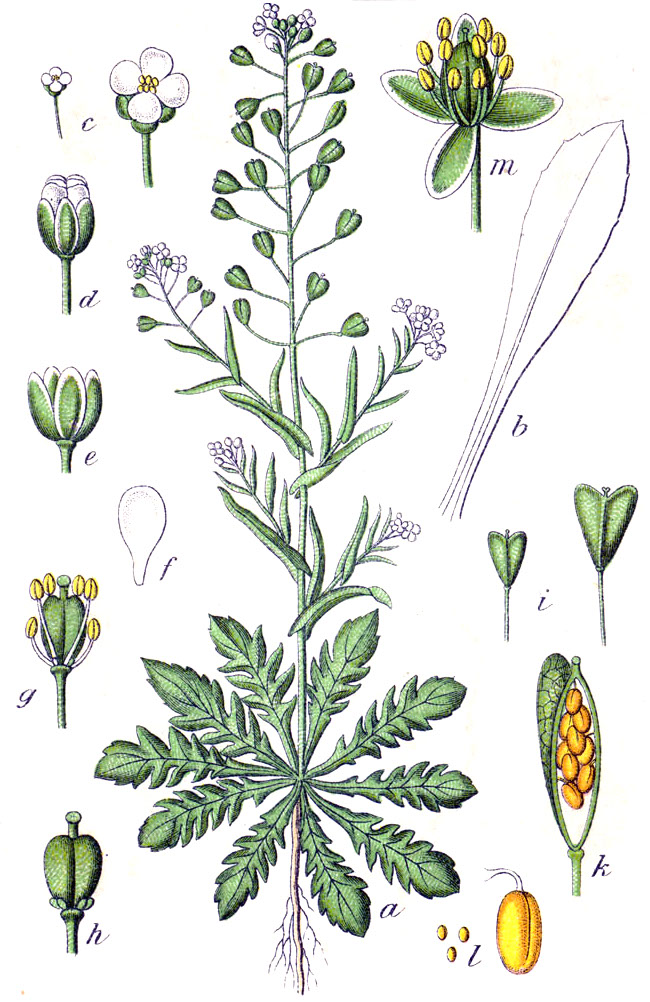
Rosette (a), pointed leaves, flowers (c–e), pods (i, k)

Capsella bursa-pastoris is a ruderal and an annual or biennial plant. It grows from a rosette of lobed leaves at the base. From the base emerges a stem most often 10–50 cm (4–20 in) tall, but occasionally as much as 70 cm (28 in) or as little as 2 cm (3/4 in), which bears a few pointed leaves partly grasping the stem, each up to 6.5 cm (2 1/2 in) long.

The flowers, which appear in any month of the year in the British Isles, are white and small, 2.5 mm (1/8 in) in diameter, with four petals and six stamens. They are borne in loose racemes, and produce flattened, two-chambered seed pods known as silicles, which are about 6 mm long and triangular to heart-shaped, each containing several seeds.

=== Research ===
Like a number of other plants in several plant families, its seeds contain a substance known as mucilage, a condition known as myxospermy. Recently, this has been demonstrated experimentally to perform the function of trapping nematodes, as a form of 'protocarnivory'.

Capsella bursa-pastoris is closely related to the model organism Arabidopsis thaliana and is also used as a model organism, because the variety of genes expressed throughout its life cycle can be compared to genes that have been well studied in A. thaliana. Unlike most flowering plants, it flowers almost all year round. Like other annual ruderals exploiting disturbed ground, C. bursa-pastoris reproduces entirely from seed, has a long soil seed bank and short generation time; it is capable of producing several generations each year.

Fumaric acid has been isolated from the plant.

== Taxonomy ==
Capsella bursa-pastoris is classified in the Capsella genus of plants in the family Brassicaceae. It has two subspecies, bursa-pastoris and thracicus.

=== History ===
A very early European illustration of Capsella bursa-pastoris was published in a medieval Herbarius in approximately 1486. The book was printed in Louvain in what is now Belgium. The species was apparently not included in the ancient pharmacopoeia with William Turner stating in 1548 that it and twenty or thirty others had come to be known as medicinal plants from Arab sources.

It was formally described by the Swedish botanist Carl Linnaeus in his seminal publication Species Plantarum (1753) and then published by Friedrich Kasimir Medikus in Pflanzen-Gattungen (Pfl.-Gatt.) in 1792.

=== Etymology ===
The genus name capsella means 'little box' and the specific epithet bursa-pastoris means 'purse of the shepherd'. William Coles wrote in his book Adam in Eden (1657), "It is called Shepherd's purse or Scrip (wallet) from the likeness of the seed hath with that kind of leathearne bag, wherein Shepherds carry their Victualls [food and drink] into the field."

== Distribution and habitat ==
It is native to eastern Europe and Asia minor, but is naturalized and considered a common weed in many parts of the world, especially in colder climates, including the British Isles (where it is regarded as an archaeophyte), North America, and China, but also in the Mediterranean and North Africa. C. bursa-pastoris is the second-most prolific wild plant in the world and is common on cultivated ground and waysides and meadows.

== Ecology ==
Pathogens of this plant include:

- White rust Albugo candida
- One species of downy mildew Hyaloperonospora parasitica
- Phoma herbarum

== Uses ==
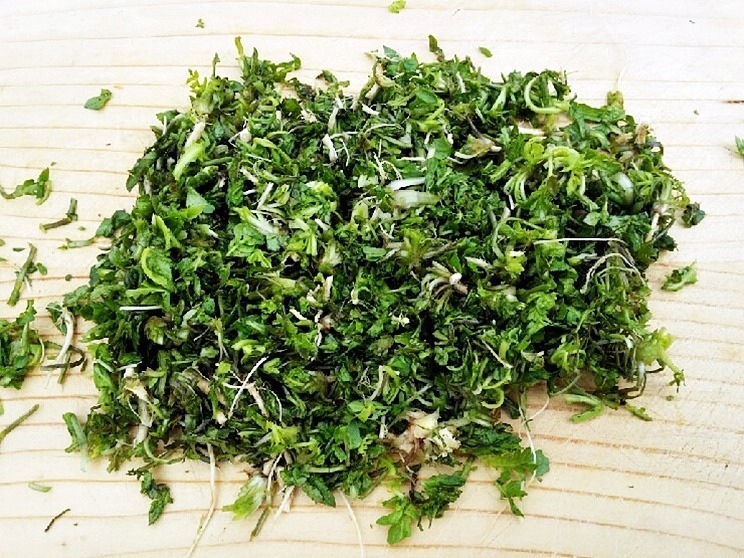
Chopped shepherd's purse

Capsella bursa-pastoris gathered from the wild or cultivated has many uses, including for food, to supplement animal feed, for cosmetics, and in traditional medicine—reportedly to stop bleeding. The plant can be eaten raw; the leaves are best when gathered young. Native Americans ground it into a meal and made a beverage from it.

=== Cooking ===
It is eaten as a leaf vegetable and cultivated as a commercial food crop in Asia. In China, where it is known as jìcài (荠菜; 薺菜) its use as food has been recorded since the Zhou dynasty. Historically, it was used to make geng soup, congee, and preserved as yāncài (醃菜). In the Ming-dynasty famine survival guide Jiuhuang bencao, it was recommended to mix jìcài with water and other ingredients to make bread-like bing. Today, it is commonly used in food in Shanghai and the surrounding Jiangnan region. The savory leaf is stir-fried with nian gao rice cakes and other ingredients or as part of the filling in wontons. It is one of the ingredients of the symbolic dish consumed in the Japanese spring-time festival, Nanakusa-no-sekku. In Korea, it is known as naengi (냉이) and used in the characteristic Korean dish, namul (fresh greens and wild vegetables).

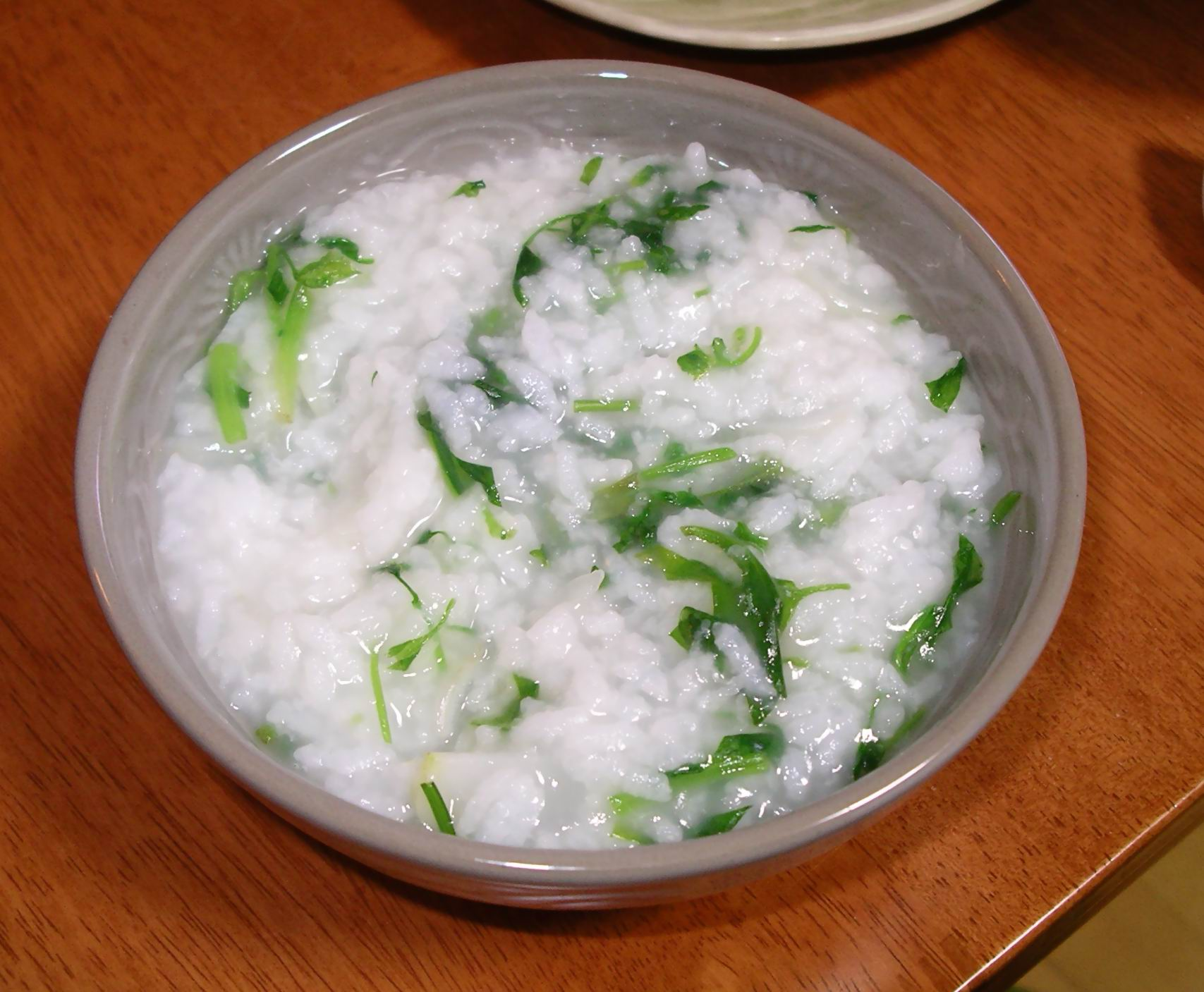
Nanakusa-gayu (seven herb congee)

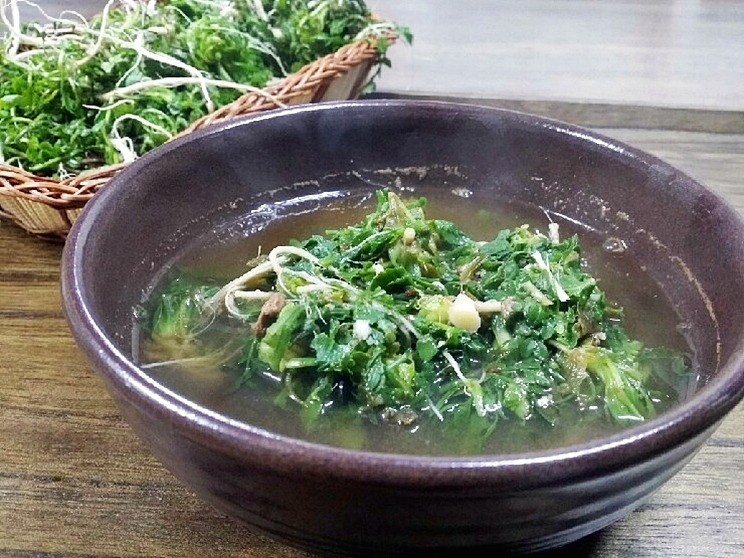
Naengi-doenjang-guk (soybean paste soup with shepherd's purse)

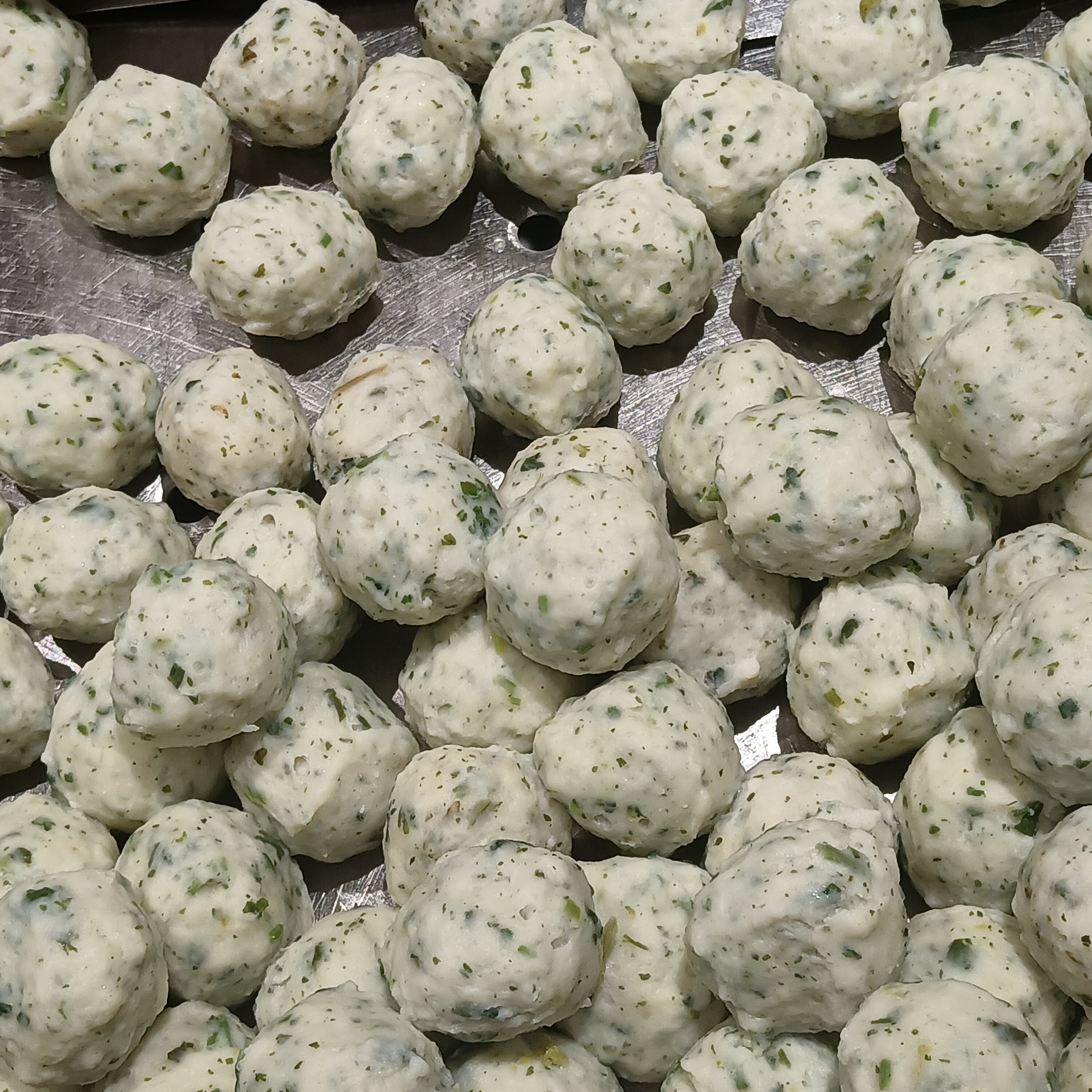
Fish balls made of cod and the plant

== In culture ==
In China, where it is known as jìcài (荠菜; 薺菜), the term first appears in the song and poetry collection Shijing (c. 1000 – 600 BCE), although this may refer to other plants. While today ji clearly indicates this species, previously it was used for all plants with leaves consumed in soups. In a poem in the Shijing, the taste of the jìcài was compared to a happy marriage. Its sweet taste is also recorded in the Erya lexicon, compiled c. 500 – 100 BCE).

In England and Scotland, the species was once commonly called 'mother's heart', from which was derived a child's game/trick of picking the seed pod, which then would burst and the child would be accused of 'breaking his mother's heart'.
