= 1573 =

1573 in various calendars
- Gregorian calendar: 1573; MDLXXIII
- Ab urbe condita: 2326
- Armenian calendar: 1022; ԹՎ ՌԻԲ
- Assyrian calendar: 6323
- Balinese saka calendar: 1494–1495
- Bengali calendar: 979–980
- Berber calendar: 2523
- English Regnal year: 15 Eliz. 1 – 16 Eliz. 1
- Buddhist calendar: 2117
- Burmese calendar: 935
- Byzantine calendar: 7081–7082
- Chinese calendar: 壬申年 (Water Monkey); 4270 or 4063 — to — 癸酉年 (Water Rooster); 4271 or 4064
- Coptic calendar: 1289–1290
- Discordian calendar: 2739
- Ethiopian calendar: 1565–1566
- Hebrew calendar: 5333–5334
- Hindu calendars
- Vikram Samvat: 1629–1630
- Shaka Samvat: 1494–1495
- Kali Yuga: 4673–4674
- Holocene calendar: 11573
- Igbo calendar: 573–574
- Iranian calendar: 951–952
- Islamic calendar: 980–981
- Japanese calendar: Genki 4 / Tenshō 1 (天正元年)
- Javanese calendar: 1492–1493
- Julian calendar: 1573; MDLXXIII
- Korean calendar: 3906
- Minguo calendar: 339 before ROC 民前339年
- Nanakshahi calendar: 105
- Thai solar calendar: 2115–2116
- Tibetan calendar: ཆུ་ཕོ་སྤྲེ་ལོ་ (male Water-Monkey); 1699 or 1318 or 546 — to — ཆུ་མོ་བྱ་ལོ་ (female Water-Bird); 1700 or 1319 or 547

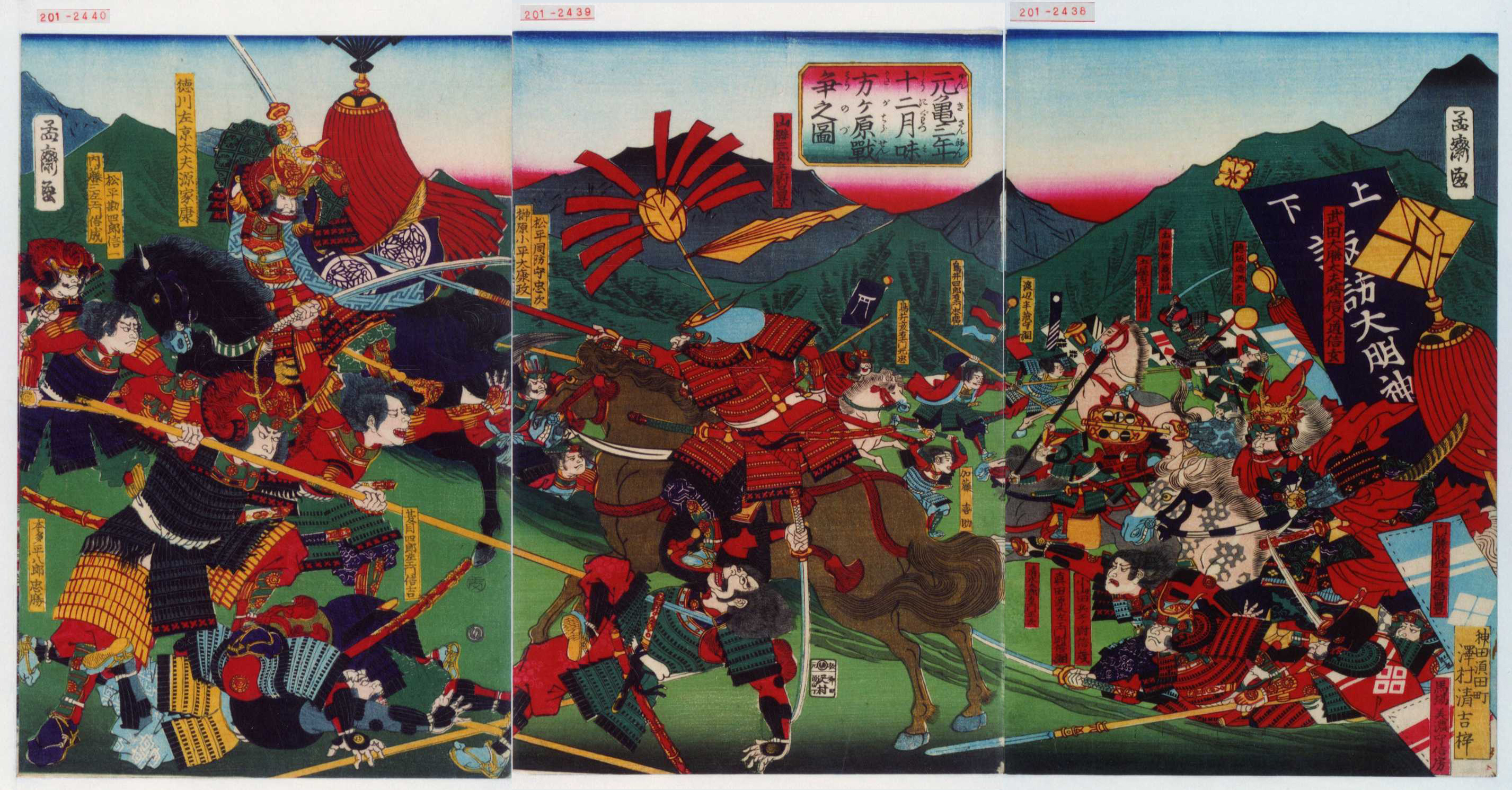
January 25: Battle of Mikatagahara in Japan

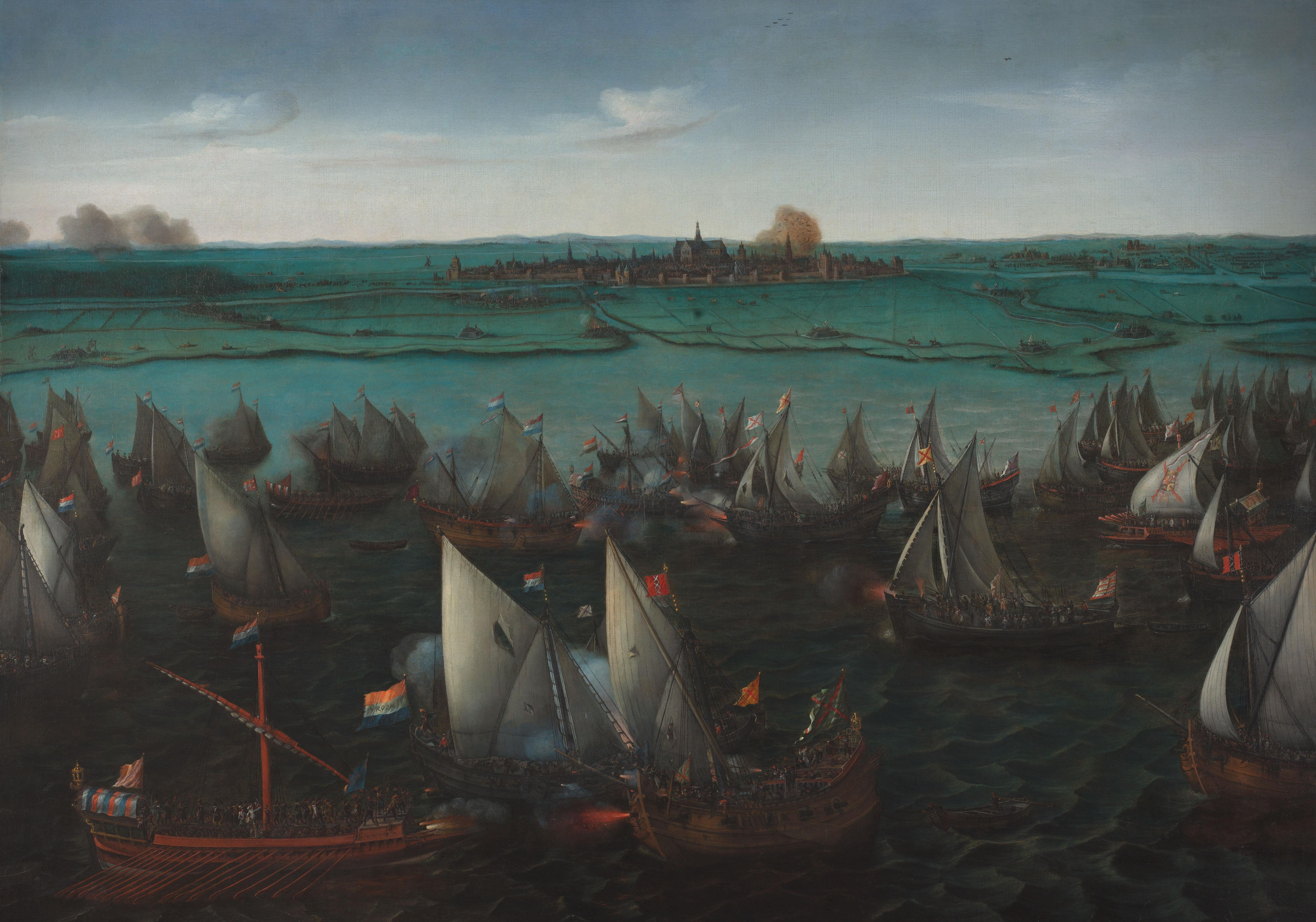
May 26: Battle of Haarlemmermeer in the Netherlands

Year 1573 (MDLXXIII) was a common year starting on Thursday of the Julian calendar.

== Events ==
=== January–March ===
- January 25 (22nd day of 12th month of Genki 3 – At the Battle of Mikatagahara in Japan, Takeda Shingen defeats Tokugawa Ieyasu.
- January 28
  - Articles of the Warsaw Confederation are signed, sanctioning religious freedom in Poland.
  - The Croatian–Slovene Peasant Revolt, started by Matija Gubec, breaks out against the Croatian nobility, but is suppressed after 18 days.
- February 2 – The Wanli Era begins in Ming dynasty China on the first New Year after 9-year-old Zhu Yijun ascends the throne.
- February 6 – In the battle of Kerestinec, General Gašpar Alapić defeats the rebel troops led by Gubec.
- February 9 – Croatian troops, led by General Alapic, defeat the peasant rebellion in the Battle of Stubica, then begin a violent campaign of vengeance against the conquered rebels. Rebellion leaders Matija Gubec and Ivan Pasanec are taken as prisoners of war for a trial for treason at Zagreb.
- February 11 – Fourth War of Religion: France's Marshal Henri de Montmorency, begins the Siege of Sommières in southern France. The Huguenots, French Protestants, hold out for almost two months against Montmorency's Catholic troops.
- February 15 – On orders of the Croatian Viceroy Juraj Drašković, Matija Gubec, the defeated leader of the Croatian–Slovene Peasant Revolt is publicly tortured with the placement of a red-hot iron crown on his head, dragged through the streets of Zagreb, and then dismembered.
- February 16–March – The siege of Noda Castle begins near what is now the city of Shinshiro in Japan, after the leader of the Takeda clan, the warlord Takeda Shingen, is shot by a sniper after offering generous terms of surrender to the Tokugawa clan, led by Tokugawa Ieyasu. By March 10, the Noda Castle surrenders.
- February 23– In the province of Munster in Ireland, the first Desmond Rebellion, led by James FitzMaurice FitzGerald, cousin of the Earl of Desmond, ends at Kilmallock as FitzGerald makes a humiliating surrender to John Perrot, the provincial leader.
- March 7 – The Ottoman–Venetian War (1570–1573) is ended by a peace treaty, confirming the transfer of control of Cyprus from the Republic of Venice to the Ottoman Empire, and also confirming Turkish occupation of the more fertile region of Dalmatia.

=== April–June ===
- April 1 – On his expedition to the New World, Francis Drake and his crew make their most lucrative capture by seizing a wagon train of silver at Panama, near the settlement of Nombre de Dios.
- April 5 – 1573 Polish–Lithuanian royal election: Polish and Lithuanian nobles gather at Warsaw to elect a successor to King Sigismund II Augustus, who had died the previous July 7. The vote comes down to four candidates, from France, the Holy Roman Empire, Sweden and Russia.
- April 9 – The Siege of Sommières ends with the surrender of the Huguenot defenders, who are spared retaliation by General Montmorency, despite the loss of 2,500 royal troops.
- April 22 – Eighty Years' War: The Battle of Borsele is fought as a fleet of Spanish ships is intercepted by Dutch Calvinist rebels (the Geuzen). While some of the ships are able to complete their mission of supplying the Spanish-governed Netherlands cities of Middelburg and Arnemuiden, most are forced to retreat to Amberes in the Spanish Netherlands, now Antwerp in Belgium.
- May 16– The Henry, Duke of Anjou, son of the late King Henry II of France is elected to the throne of the Polish–Lithuanian Commonwealth by the Polish nobility, after being nominated on May 11.
- May 26 – Battle of Haarlemmermeer: Geuzen ships, attempting to break the siege of Haarlem, are defeated by a combined Spanish and Amsterdam fleet.
- June 24 – After Henry, Duke of Anjou learns that he has been elected the King of Poland, he agrees to negotiate an end to the Siege of La Rochelle, which has continued for almost nine months against the Huguenots in the western French city, and reaches an agreement with the Huguenot defender, the Count of Montgomery.

=== July–September ===
- July 6 – Córdoba, in the Viceroyalty of Peru, is founded by Jerónimo Luis de Cabrera.
- July 11 – The Edict of Boulogne is signed by Charles IX of France, granting limited rights to Huguenots, and ending the Fourth War of Religion in France.
- July 12 – Siege of Haarlem: Spanish forces under the Duke of Alva capture Haarlem, after a seven-month siege.
- August 21 – The Duke of Alva begins the siege of Alkmaar in North Holland, before retreating after seven weeks.
- August 27 – Oda Nobunaga drives the 15th Ashikaga shōgun Ashikaga Yoshiaki out of Kyoto, effectively destroying the Ashikaga shogunate, and historically ending the Muromachi and Sengoku periods. The Azuchi–Momoyama period of Japan begins.
- September 16 – In Japan, elimination of the Asakura clan is completed by Oda Nobunaga after the siege of Hikida Castle and the siege of Ichijōdani Castle are completed in eight days.
- September 26 – The Azai clan is eliminated by Oda Nobunaga after the four day siege of Odani Castle in Japan.

=== October–December ===
- October 8 – The Spanish abandon the siege of the city of Alkmaar and concede the city to the Geuzen, the Dutch Calvinist rebels.
- October 11 – The Spanish under John of Austria take Tunis with little resistance.
- November 15 – Santa Fe, Argentina, is founded by Juan de Garay.
- November 29 – The Duke of Alva resigns as the Spanish Governor-General of the Netherlands, and is succeeded by Luis de Requesens, who attempts to pursue a more conciliatory policy.
- December 3 – The French Duke of Anjou, recently elected as King Henry of Poland, departs from Metz with an entourage of 1,200 people, arriving at Kraków on February 18.
- December 11 – The Governor of Portuguese India issues an edict depriving Hindu followers of most rights, including the right to receive Jonoa, the share of the village community income.
- December 17 – Portuguese colonists are expelled from the Maldives, where Portugal has had a presence since 1558, by order of the Sultan's son, Mohamed Bodu Takurufanu al-Azam.
- December 23 – In the Republic of Venice, the Council of Ten votes to grant safe conduct to Venice for Spanish and Portuguese Jews.

=== Date unknown ===
- Sarsa Dengel, emperor of Ethiopia, defeats the Oromo in a battle near Lake Zway.
- The first Spanish galleon, laden with silver for the porcelain and silk trade with the Ming Dynasty of China, lands at Manila in the Philippines. This occasion marks the beginning of the Spanish silver trade to China, that will trump that of the Portuguese, the latter of whom acted as an intermediary between the silver mines of Japan, and the luxury items in China to be purchased with that silver. Most of the silver entering China comes from what is now Mexico, Bolivia, and Peru in the New World.
- The Luzhou Laojiao liquor is made.
- Queen Elizabeth's Grammar School for Boys, Barnet, England, is formed.

== Births ==
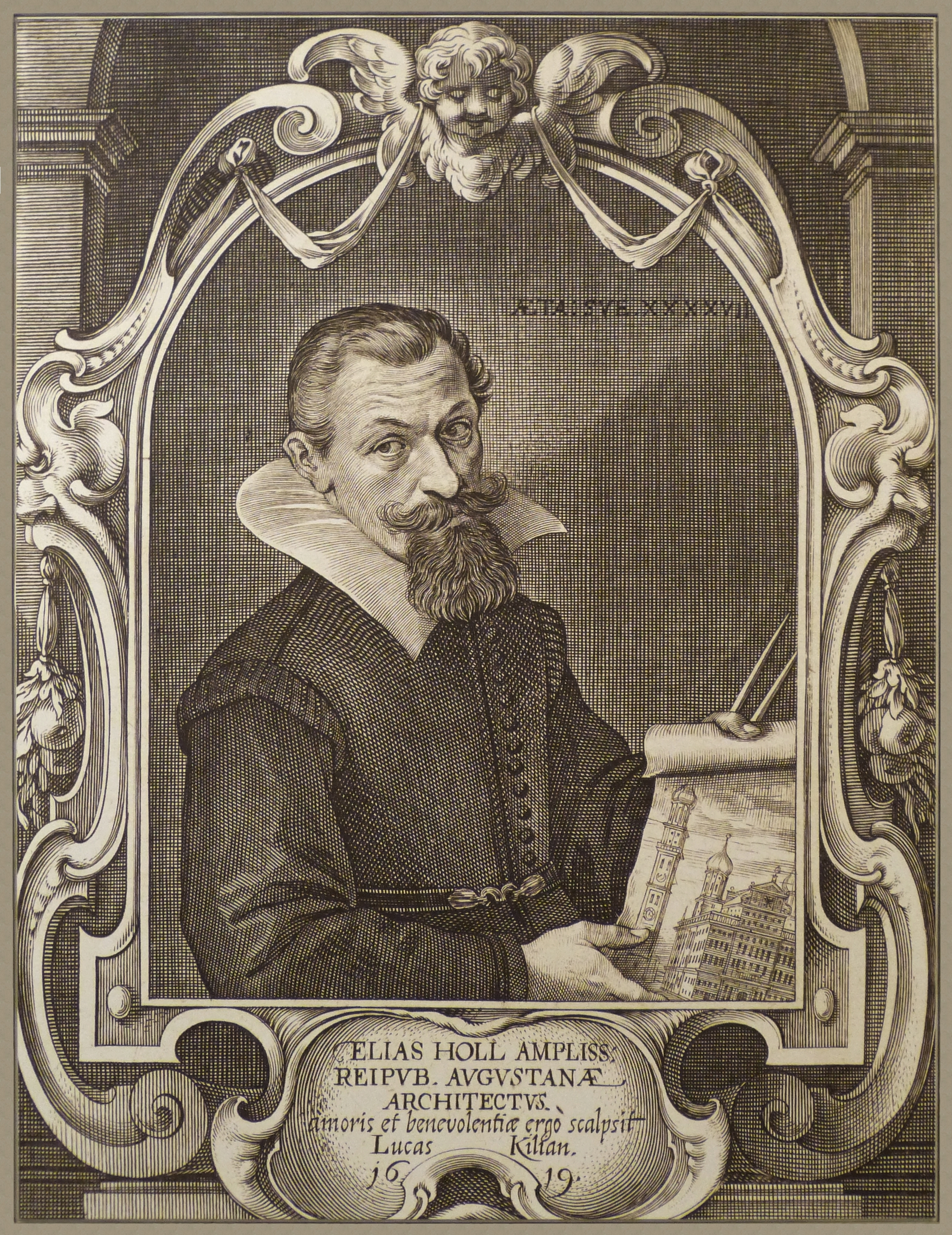
Elias Holl

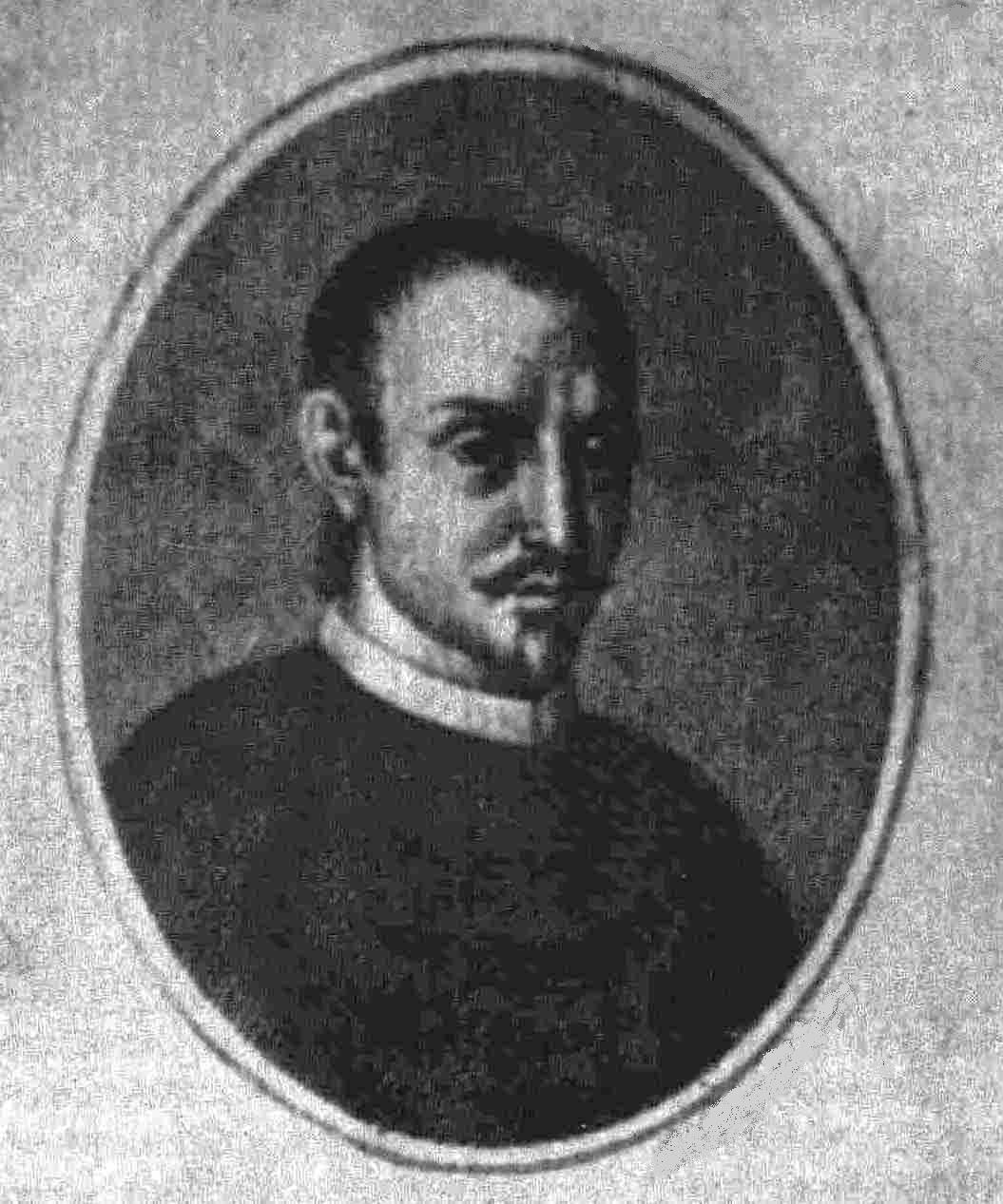
Pietro Carrera

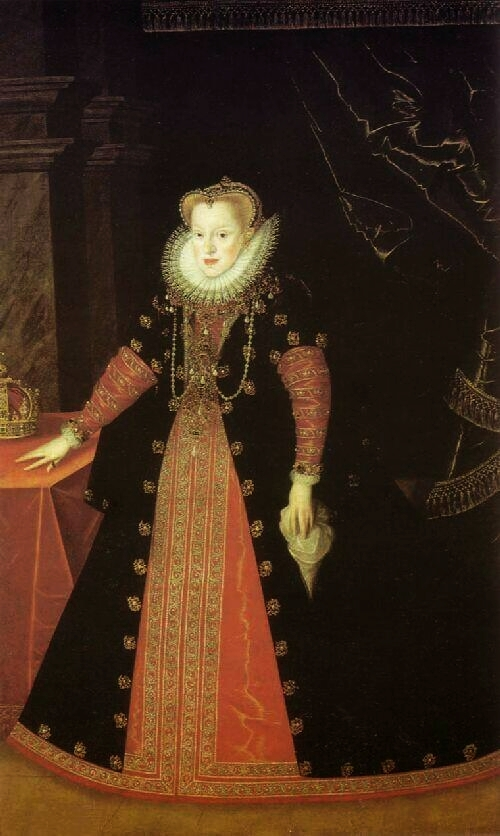
Anne of Austria, Queen of Poland

- January 10 – Simon Marius, German astronomer (d. 1624)
- January 18 – Ambrosius Bosschaert, still life painter of the Dutch Golden Age (d. 1621)
- January 20 – Alexander, Duke of Schleswig-Holstein-Sonderburg (d. 1627)
- January 22 – Ludwig Camerarius, German politician (d. 1651)
- January 30 – Georg Friedrich, Margrave of Baden-Durlach (1604–1622) (d. 1638)
- February 28 – Elias Holl, German architect (d. 1646)
- March 12 – Agnes Hedwig of Anhalt, Abbess of Gernrode, Electress of Saxony, Duchess of Schleswig-Holstein-Sønderborg-Plön (d. 1616)
- March 24 – Giovanni Doria, Spanish noble (d. 1642)
- April 6 – Margaret of Brunswick-Lüneburg, German noble (d. 1643)
- April 12 – Jacques Bonfrère, Flemish Jesuit priest, biblical scholar (d. 1642)
- April 13 – Christina of Holstein-Gottorp, Queen of Sweden (d. 1625)
- April 17 – Maximilian I, Elector of Bavaria (d. 1651)
- April 28 – Charles de Valois, Duke of Angoulême, natural son of Charles IX of France (d. 1650)
- May 12 – Henri, Duke of Montpensier, French noble (d. 1608)
- May 13 – Taj Bibi Bilqis Makani, Mughal empress (d. 1619)
- June 12 – Robert Radclyffe, 5th Earl of Sussex, British Earl (d. 1629)
- June 16 – Andries de Witt, Grand Pensionary of Holland (d. 1637)
- June 28 – Henry Danvers, 1st Earl of Danby, English noble (d. 1643)
- July 12 – Pietro Carrera, Italian priest, painter and saint (d. 1647)
- July 14 – Bonaventure Hepburn, Scottish philologist and Minim friar (d. 1620)
- July 15 – Inigo Jones, English architect (d. 1652)
- July 18 – Odoardo Fialetti, Italian painter (d. 1638)
- July 25 – Christoph Scheiner, German astronomer and Jesuit (d. 1650)
- July 29 – Philip II, Duke of Pomerania-Stettin (d. 1618)
- August 16 – Anne of Austria, Queen of Poland (d. 1598)
- August 25 – Elizabeth of Denmark, Duchess of Brunswick-Wolfenbüttel, German regent (d. 1626)
- September 8 – Georg Friedrich von Greiffenklau, Archbishop of Mainz (d. 1629)
- September 28 – Théodore de Mayerne, Swiss physician (d. 1654)
- September 29 – Robert Payne, English politician (d. 1631)
- October 6 – Henry Wriothesley, 3rd Earl of Southampton (d. 1624)
- October 7 – William Laud, Archbishop of Canterbury (d. 1645)
- October 11 – Jacobus Boonen, Dutch Catholic archbishop (d. 1655)
- November 3 – Catherine of Lorraine, Abbess of Remiremont (d. 1648)
- November 29 – Johannes Canuti Lenaeus, archbishop of Uppsala (d. 1669)
- November 30 – Aubert Miraeus, Belgian historian (d. 1640)
- December 7 – Odoardo Farnese, Italian Catholic cardinal (d. 1626)
- December 21 – Mathurin Régnier, French satirist (d. 1613)
- December 22 – Ernest Casimir I, Count of Nassau-Dietz (1606–1632) and Stadtholder of Groningen, Friesland and Drenthe (1625–1632) (d. 1632)
- December 23 – Giovanni Battista Crespi, Italian painter (d. 1632)
- date unknown
  - Gabrielle d'Estrées, French royal mistress (d. 1599)
  - Richard Johnson, English romance writer (d. 1659)
  - Johannes Junius, Burgomeister of Bamberg (d. 1628)
  - Oeyo, wife of Tokugawa Hidetada (d. 1626)
  - Sigismund Báthory, Prince of Transylvania and of the Holy Roman Empire (d. 1613)
- approximate year
  - June – Joan Pau Pujol, Catalan composer and organist (d. 1626)

== Deaths ==
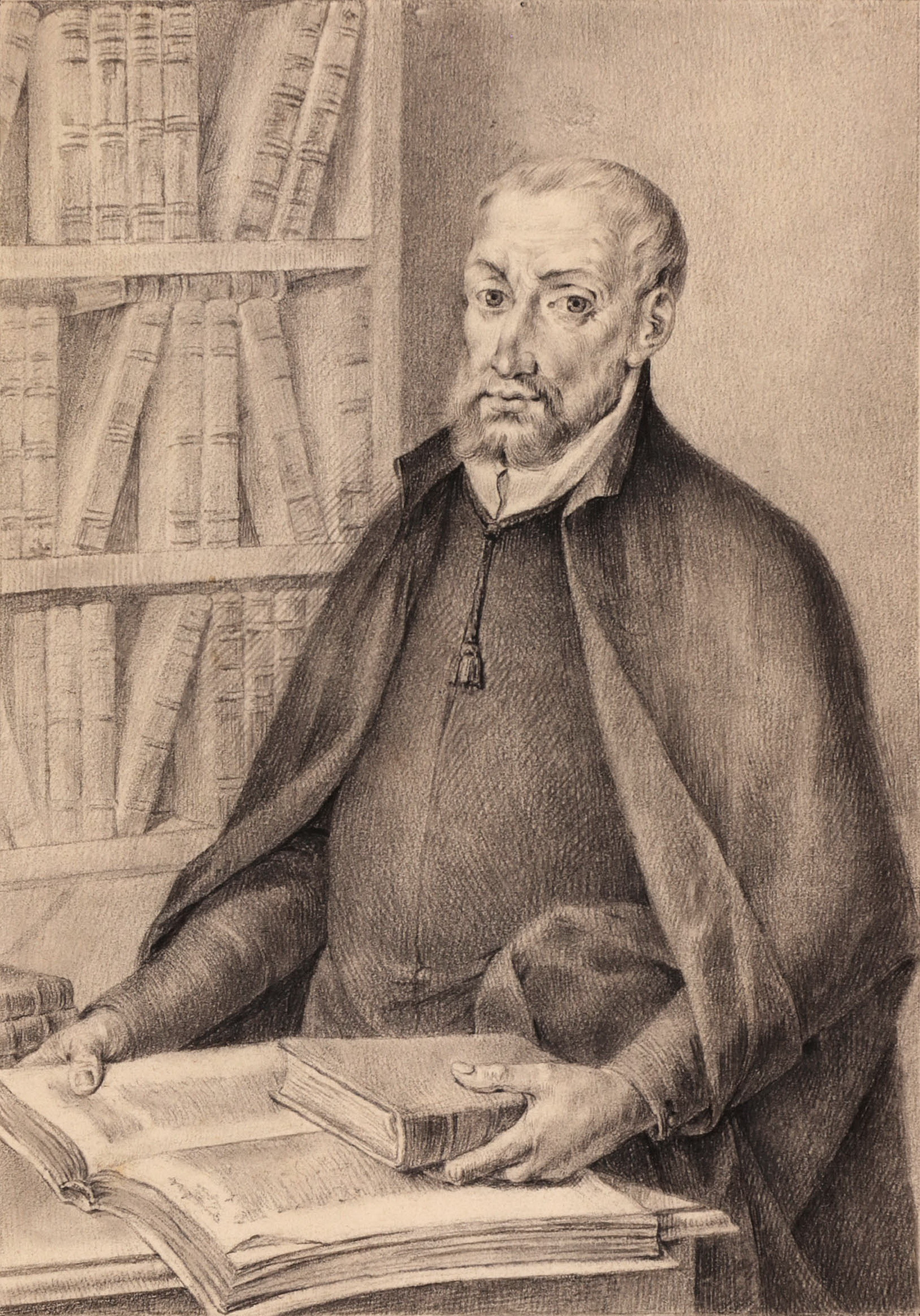
Juan Ginés de Sepúlveda

- January 1
  - Hans Boije af Gennäs, Swedish commander
  - Johann Pfeffinger, German theologian (b. 1493)
- January 12 – William Howard, 1st Baron Howard of Effingham, English Lord High Admiral (b. 1510)
- February 7 – Hedwig Jagiellon, Electress of Brandenburg (b. 1513)
- March 2 – Johann Wilhelm, Duke of Saxe-Weimar (b. 1530)
- March 3 – Claude, Duke of Aumale, third son of Claude, Duke of Guise (b. 1526)
- March 13 – Michel de l'Hôpital, French statesman (b. 1505)
- March 17 – Maria van Schooten, Dutch war heroine (b. 1555)
- April 2 – Otto Truchsess von Waldburg, German Catholic cardinal (b. 1514)
- April 7 – Andreas Masius, Flemish Catholic priest (b. 1514)
- April 29 – Guillaume Le Testu, French privateer (b. 1509)
- May 13 – Takeda Shingen, Japanese warlord (b. 1521)
- June 15 – Antun Vrančić, Croatian archbishop (b. 1504)
- July – Étienne Jodelle, French dramatist and poet (b. 1532)
- July 7 – Giacomo Barozzi da Vignola, Italian architect (b. 1507)
- July 16 – Wigbolt Ripperda, mayor of Haarlem, Netherlands
- July 29
  - John Caius, English physician (b. 1510)
  - Ruy Gómez de Silva, Portuguese noble (b. 1516)
- August 14 – Saitō Tatsuoki, Japanese warlord (b. 1548)
- September 7 – Joanna of Austria, Princess of Portugal (b. 1535)
- September 16 – Asakura Yoshikage, Japanese warlord (b. 1533)
- September 23 – Azai Hisamasa, Japanese warlord (b. 1526)
- September 26 – Azai Nagamasa, Japanese warlord (b. 1545)
- October 27 – Laurentius Petri, first Lutheran Archbishop of Sweden (b. 1499)
- November 9 – Shimazu Katsuhisa, Japanese nobleman (b. 1503)
- November 17 – Juan Ginés de Sepúlveda, Spanish philosopher and theologian (b. 1494)
- December 30 – Giovanni Battista Giraldi, Italian novelist and poet (b. 1504)
- date unknown
  - Paul Skalich, Croatian encyclopedist (b. 1534)
  - Reginald Wolfe, English printer
- February 3 – Murakami Yoshikiyo, Japanese warlord (b. 1501)
  - Richard Grafton, English merchant and printer (b. c.1506/7)
