= Battle of Krško (1573) =

- Part of Croatian–Slovene Peasant Revolt
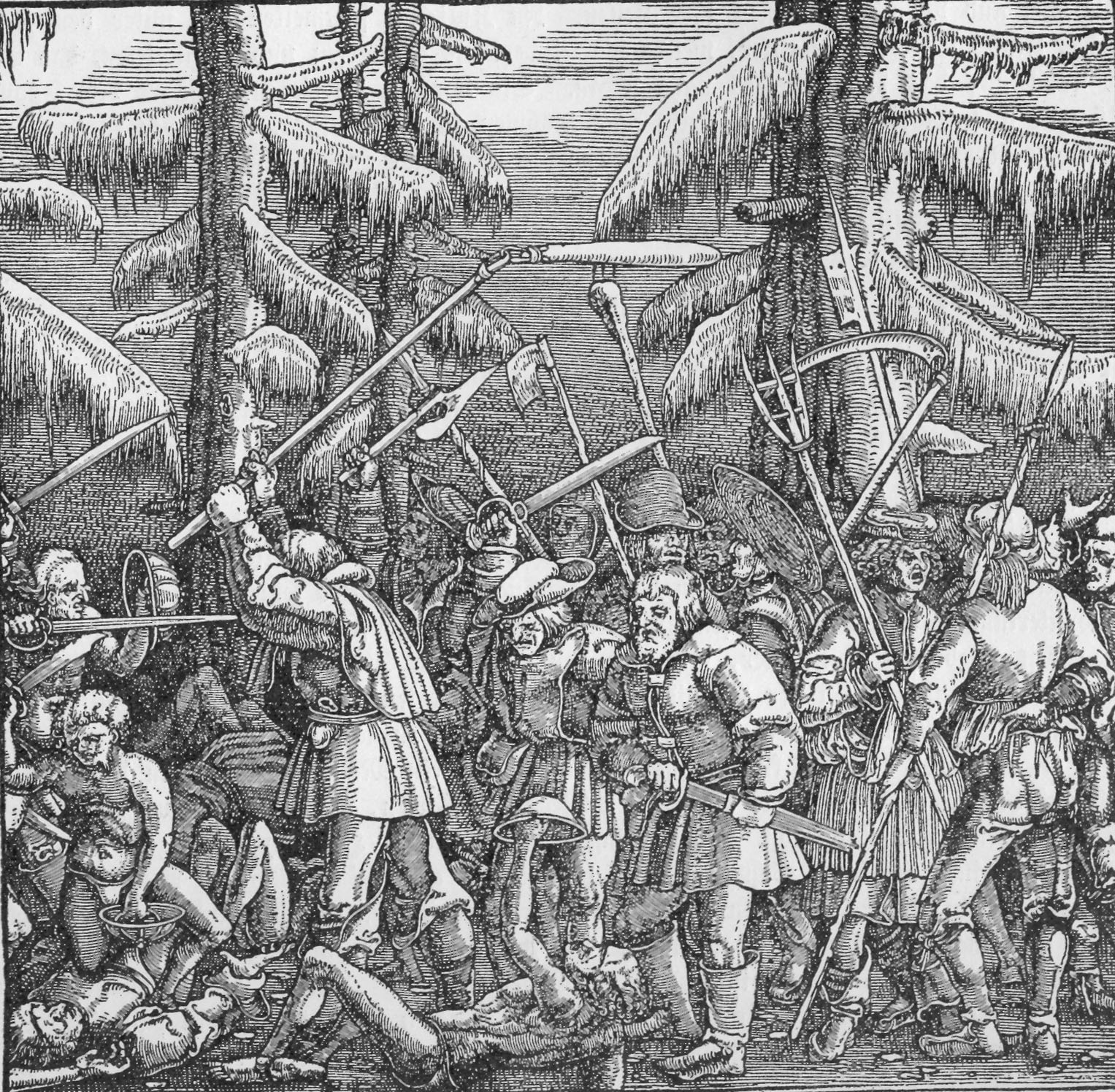
- A 16th-century peasant rebellion.
Date	5 February 1573
Location	Krško, then Habsburg monarchy (present day Slovenia)
Result	Royal victory

Belligerents
Rebelled peasants	Habsburg Monarchy

Commanders and leaders
Nikola Kupinić	Josip "Jošt" Thurn

Strength
Between 2000 and 3000 men	Around 500 men

Casualties and losses
Heavy	Light

The Battle of Krško was an engagement during the Croatian–Slovene Peasant Revolt of 1573.

== Background ==
The Croatian–Slovene Peasant Revolt of 1573 erupted as a consequence of difficult life conditions of Croatian and Slovene serfs in the late stage of feudalism. Nobility and clergy enjoyed privileges and all political rights, while completely disenfranchised peasantry carried all the hard burdens of state, especially forced labour such as Corvée. At the same time, peasantry was more than anyone affected by the Ottoman akinji raids while also participating in the wars against the Ottoman Empire.

The uprising erupted on 29 January 1573 in Croatian Zagorje, including lands south of the Sava river, near settlements: Mokrice, Samobor, Okić and Jastrebarsko. In neighbouring Styria, rebellion erupted in area between Bizeljsko and Podčetrtek and continued spreading towards Brežice. One of the rebel serfs' commanders, Ilija Gregorić, managed to capture Cesargrad castle with the help of serfs from neighbouring Bizeljsko.

=== Opposing forces ===
==== Nobility ====
Uskoks captain Josip Thurn commanded a contingent of some 500 men consisting of uskoks (haramijas) equipped with firearms. There were also some German infantry and cavalry, as well as a Bihać cavalry contingent led by lieutenant Danilo Laser. Additionally, he also had at his disposal some musketeers, arquebusiers and hussars.

==== Rebellious peasantry ====
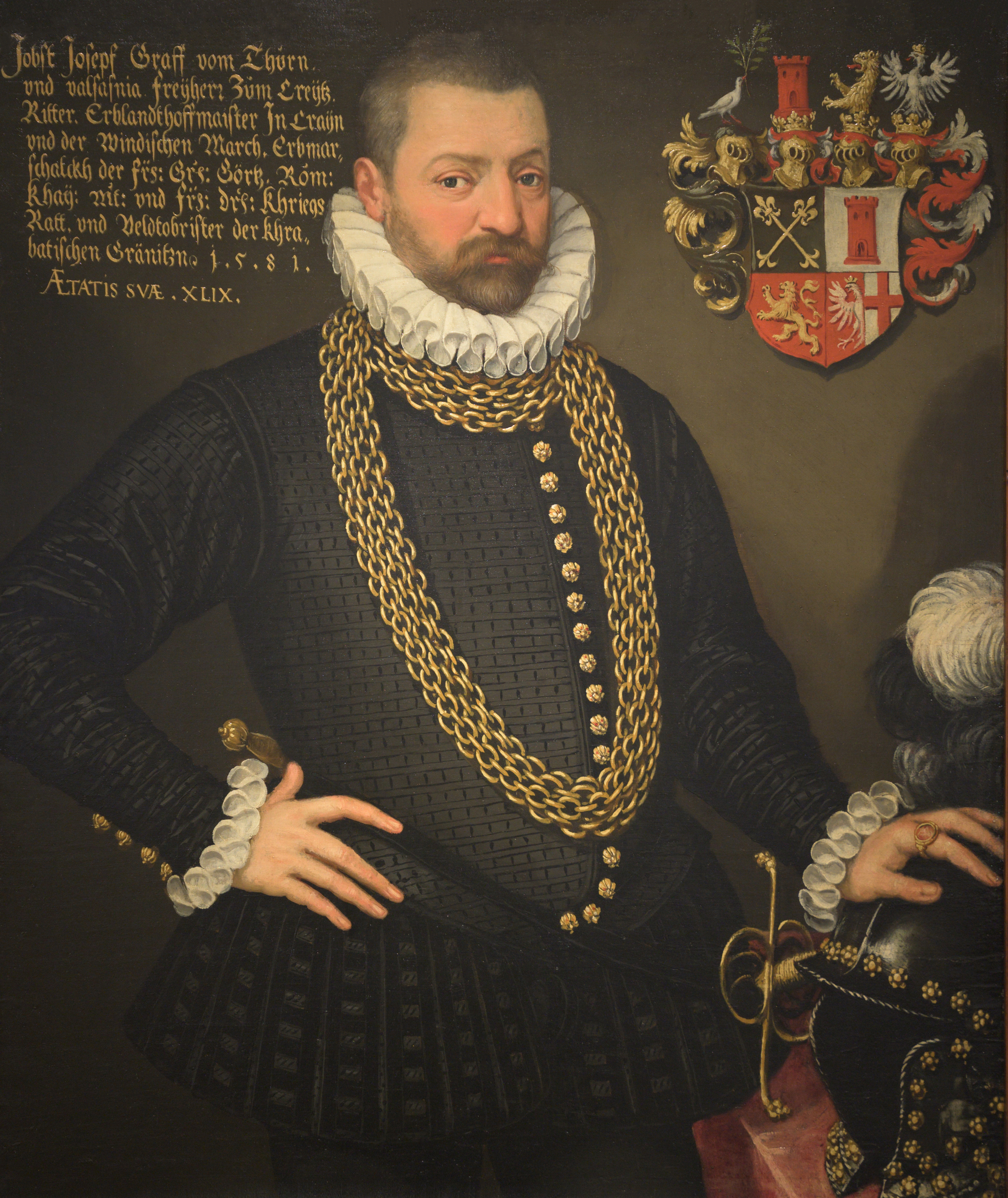
A 1581 portrait of Josip Thurn.

Rebel captain Nikola Kupinić led a contingent of some two thousand Croatian and Slovene serfs. Most of the serfs had some combat experience; either by serving in Landsturm wars against the Ottomans, where they served as either infantry, cavalry, or musketeers. In addition, serfs from Susedgrad-Stubica Segniory already fought in feudal struggles between Hennings and Tahys over control of Susedgrad Castle. For example, in January 1565, Hennings armed their 800 serfs for taking over Stubica castle. A few years later, a 3,000 strong serf army armed and equipped by Croatian vice-ban Ambroz Gregorijanec managed to defeat a royal Croatian army near the castle of Susedgrad. Nonetheless, when the peasant revolt erupted, most of the weaponry and ammunition remained stored in fortified castles controlled by the nobility. The only castles which peasants did manage to take were Cesargrad (captured on 29 January 1573) and Krško, which surrendered without a fight between 4 and 5 February. From these victories, serfs managed to capture some muskets, sabres, spears and some 8-10 light Lombard cannons. As most of these weapons ended distributed between various peasant armies, most of the serfs were merely infantry armed with axes, flails, scythes or with some muskets with little ammunition. Some 10% of rebel serfs could also fight as light cavalry. Many serfs used bows and arrows.

== The battle ==
After ravaging Brežice on 3 February, rebel serfs entered Krško on 5 February following negotiations, and without a fight. On the same day, rebel forces led by Ilija Gregorić split into two groups near Videm. A larger 2,000 strong contingent led by Nikola Kupinić crossed the Sava river, and hoped to advance through the Krka river valley to Novo Mesto, with an objective to persuade local peasants to join their cause. They also planned to persuade Žumberak uskoks to join them. Meanwhile, baron Josip Thurn learnt about the atmosphere of mutiny among the uskoks, due to unpaid salaries. He first had these salaries paid from his own pocket, after which he had 3 of the loudest uskok rebels hanged. After regaining discipline among his uskoks, Thurn with his 500 strong army reached Krško on 5 February. Rebels soon spotted a well organized contingent of professional soldiers, so they pulled back to Krško.

Thurn's troops quickly seized the initiative and attacked Krško. In his letter to Carniolan estates, Thurn wrote that he ordered one contingent of his infantry to enter the town "from the upper side", while simultaneously ordering his cavalry to charge the town from the opposite side. He wrote that his men killed many peasants "with God's aid", while many more peasants drowned in Sava river. In conclusion of his letter, he wrote that his uskoks raged so fiercely over defeated peasants that even he himself felt pity. The peasant defeat at Krško had a decisive effect in scaring away the peasant movement in Carniola and Styria.

== Consequences ==
Upon learning of peasant defeat at Krško, Gregorić headed to village of Planina, where another group of rebelled peasants, led by Pavao Šterc, awaited. Due to disinformation about ongoing Ottoman raid in the area, this group of rebels quickly dispersed. Meanwhile, Šterc got captured by some local segniory commander. As Gregorić could not do anything to save Šterc from captivity, he decided to withdraw across Pilštanj, back to Zagorje.

== Literature ==
- Шеноа, Август (1969). Сељачка буна. Загреб: Младост. pp. 301–314.
- Гажевић, Никола, ed. (1972a). Војна енциклопедија (том 3). Београд: Војноиздавачки завод. pp. 509–511.
- Гажевић, Никола, ed. (1972b). Војна енциклопедија (том 4). Београд: Војноиздавачки завод. p. 739.
- Гажевић, Никола, ed. (1976). Војна енциклопедија (том 10). Београд: Војноиздавачки завод. pp. 556–557.
