= Anno Domini 1573 =

1975 film

- Directed by: Vatroslav Mimica
- Written by: Vatroslav Mimica
- Produced by: Sulejman Kapić (executive producer); Branko Lustig (production manager)
- Starring: Srđan Mimica; Fabijan Šovagović; Bata Živojinović; Pavle Vuisić; Franjo Majetić
- Cinematography: Branko Blažina
- Edited by: Vuksan Lukovac
- Music by: Alfi Kabiljo
- Production companies: Jadran Film; Croatia Film; Filmska radna zajednica
- Release date: 14 November 1975
- Running time: 161 minutes (original theatrical cut); 125 minutes (TV cut); 110 minutes (DVD release)
- Country: SFR Yugoslavia
- Languages: Croatian (Kajkavian dialect)

Anno Domini 1573 (Serbo-Croatian: Seljačka buna 1573, English: 1573 Peasants' Revolt) is a 1975 Yugoslav/Croatian feature film directed by Vatroslav Mimica. The film was selected for Directors' Fortnight section at Cannes Film Festival in 1976.

It is a historical drama film depicting events surrounding the 1573 Croatian-Slovenian peasant revolt, with Fabijan Šovagović starring as Matija Gubec, the legendary peasant leader.

== Plot ==
In 1573, in Hrvatsko Zagorje, Petar and his father are out in Baron Franjo Tahy's forest searching food for their family, but are caught by Tahy's men. Petar's father is forced to strip naked, and then is chased down and killed by Tahy's dogs. Petar returns to his village, where Tahy is taking food from the peasants for his own supplies; even virgin girls are taken away to his castle. Rumours are beginning to swell about the "Oathed Brotherhood," a group of peasant leaders who intend to rise up against the nobility.

A comedian troupe (including Regica) arrives in Petar's village, putting on a show to mock the local nobility and church leadership. When Tahy's men approach the village, they flee. Petar accompanies them, hoping to use them to find the Oathed Brotherhood. Petar encounters Ilija Gregorić, who takes on Imperial troops by himself and kills them all. Astounded by Gregorić's bravery, Petar follows them to the next town. Gregorić takes Petar in as his squire, but is then captured by Imperial soldiers, just as an artist was sketching him. Before he leaves, Gregorić tells Petar to head to a blacksmith to find out about his fate.

Petar goes to the blacksmith, and witnesses Gregorić escape from the soldiers. Gregorić and Petar escape together, with Gregorić intending to leave altogether. Petar refuses to leave, wishing to avenge his father's death. Someone arrives, saying that Gregorić is wanted at a meeting. There, he meets Matija Gubec, Trgovac Mikula, and other leaders of the upcoming peasant rebellion. They say that they are planning the rebellion soon, and wish Gregorić to train and lead the troops. They intend to lead the attack in winter, as the nobles despise winter and the peasants are much more disgruntled then. Gubec states their goal with: "We want all men to be equal. The same as when they were born." Together, the men all swear an oath to see this rebellion through.

Winter comes, and the peasants, under the leadership of Gregorić and the others, gather together with the main rebel force to overthrow the local nobility. Petar arrives, finding his mother and sisters among the rebel ranks just as they are forming. Armed with only a dagger, he joins them.

The peasants arrive at Tahy's castle armed. Tahy considers it no danger, and sends his servants to whip them away. At first, the peasants seem to be frightened back, but then Petar kills one of the men, prompting the peasants to assault the walls. Tahy's servants refuse to help him, and he goes into hiding. After much loss, the peasants break through the defences, storming the castle. The nobles are discovered, and a peasant girl slays Tahy's son. The peasants enjoy the wealth and luxury found within, which is distributed among them. With no military presence to stop them, the peasants expand their influence. They release a proclamation, banning the nobility, the influence of the Roman Catholic Church, and declaring independence.

At the peasant camp, Mikula is brought forward on the charge that he confiscated property from a peasant. Gubec orders him hung - the penalty for theft. When Mikula contests he be spared on account he was one of the founding supporters of the revolt, Gubec orders the execution anyway. Afterwards, he reminds the peasants "Why did we arise, but to change the customs of noblemen - their rights and privileges?" He assures them that their voice will never be lost, but "this rightful peasant struggle" will be heard throughout the ages. Gubec goes to be in private, and finds out that the artist actually speaks Croatian, feigning his foreign background to earn respect. Meanwhile, Petar comes across peasants who had been captured by the noble army. They had been defaced, losing tongues, eyes, etc. They warn Petar to quit the rebellion, but he refuses.

The peasant army assembles in a camp, hearing that the Kaiser's army is approaching. The next day they confront the army at the Battle of Stubičko polje, with the peasants behind makeshift defences. The initial Imperial cavalry charge is lured through an opening in the defences and crushed, after which the defences are closed. A counterattack by the peasants is launched, which temporarily drives the Imperials left flank. The members of the comedian troupe are killed in the midst of the fight. Mercenaries are thrown against the peasants, and despite heavy casualties among the peasants, they too are driven away. At that point, Imperial reinforcements arrive, and attack the peasants from the rear. The peasant forces are decimated and break. Petar is wounded, losing an eye.

In the aftermath, Imperial and Roman Catholic authorities burn all records of the rebellion found among the peasants. Gubec is sentenced to execution. On the day of his execution, surviving members of the rebellion, including Petar, are marched through the streets, where nobles (some of whom had been spared previously) toss food and mock them. Gubec is bound to a fake throne and has a heated cow's ring placed on his head for a crown, from which he dies before the throne is lit aflame.

Petar returns to his land, where the blacksmith's location is burned down. He's had a child with Regica, and has taken up the role of jester, becoming a comedian after all. He sees some nobles out for a hunt and comments "If they think this fight is done, they're awfully mistaken. When we strike for a second time, not even their roots will stay on this land." As the film ends, the two of them sing together, walking in the midst of executed peasants hanging from torture wheels.

== Cast ==
- Sergio Mimica-Gezzan - Petar (Petrek)
- Fabijan Šovagović - Matija Gubec
- Bata Živojinović - Ilija Gregorić
- Pavle Vuisić - Franjo Tahy
- Franjo Majetić - Gladni glumac (The Actor)
- Zdenka Heršak - Kata Palondra
- Boris Festini - Guska
- Marina Nemet - Regica
- Charles Millot - Juraj Drašković
- Lojze Rozman - Gašpar Alapić

== Production ==
The biggest Croatian production of the time, the film was three years in pre-production, and was shot in 1974 and premièred in 1976. Television series was in post-production until 1979. The budget comprised the usual budget of two Croatian films at the time, with extra funds from the television, but it was half the usual budget of the similar scale Partisan film spectacles. The film attracted 400,000 - 500,000 viewers in SFR Yugoslavia alone.

Although it is widely believed that the film is based on Seljačka buna, a famous Romantic novel written by August Šenoa in 1887, that is not correct. The film's titles credit only Vatroslav Mimica for the screenplay. He conceptualised the film as an anti-Romantic, "materialist" and Brechtian answer to Šenoa's canonical (and somewhat nationalist) literary depiction of the historical event, grounding it in the Marxist interpretation.

The film exists in multiple theatrical cuts. The original version of the film, approved by Mimica and screened and the Pula Film festival in 1976, runs for 161 minutes, while the usual Croatian Television broadcast runs for 125 minutes. The film was released on DVD in 2012 by Jutarnji list daily newspapers, in cut of 110 minutes.

There is also confusion with the film's title. The film was distributed in Yugoslavia as Seljačka buna 1573, while the 1979 television series and international distribution used Anno domini 1573 as the title. Nevertheless, the original film posters and many other sources use Seljačka buna (Anno domini 1573) as the film title.

The film music, composed by Alfi Kabiljo, was the first Croatian film soundtrack (i.e. released as an LP album).

== Television series ==
In 1979 Television Zagreb broadcast the television series made from the film, titled Anno domini 1573, told in different story line, with the inserted drawings in Bruegel style and narrated (by the character Petar, played by director's son Sergio Mimica-Gezzan, a young man who witnesses the uprising and does not appear in Šenoa's novel) in old Kajkavian dialect. The four-part TV series makes even stronger accents on connection between the peasant uprising and 20th century proletarian revolution and Yugoslav socialism, seeing the 1573 uprising as the people's movement and announcement of the Renaissance and modern age in that part of Europe. The series was broadcast in 1979 and 1982, and then fell into obscurity. It was re-broadcast in 2009 to a great success, since when it is regularly on the Croatian Television's programme.

== Reception ==
The film won the Big Bronze Arena at the 1976 Pula Film Festival, the Yugoslav national film awards. Golden Arena for Best Cinematography was awarded to Branko Blažina and Golden Arena for Best Film Music to Alfi Kabiljo.

The film was screened at 1976 Cannes Film Festival in Directors' Fortnight section, to good reviews. In 1977 it won 3rd jury prize at the São Paulo International Film Festival.

Film was successfully distributed in Italy. After Italian screening of the film Mimica met with Akira Kurosawa who said that he has seen the film and he had liked how Mimica has directed the battle. Mimica later claimed that Kurosawa's later film Kagemusha resembled his Anno domini 1573.
