= Thomas Creech =

English translator (1659–1700)

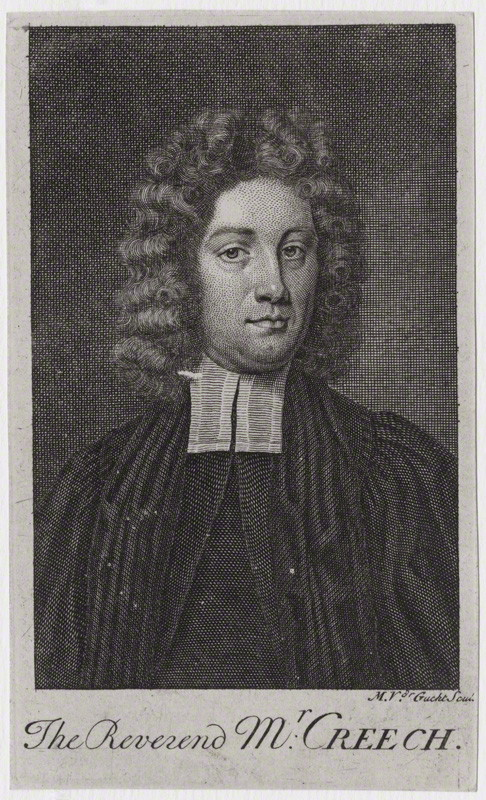
Thomas Creech

Thomas Creech (1659 – found dead 19 July 1700) was an English translator of classical works, and headmaster of Sherborne School. Creech translated Lucretius into verse in 1682, for which he received a Fellowship at Oxford. He also produced English versions of Manilius, Horace, Theocritus, and other classics.

== Life ==
He was born at Blandford Forum, Dorset. His father, also called Thomas Creech, died in 1720, and his mother, Jane Creech, died in 1693; they had two children, Thomas the translator and one daughter Bridget, who married Thomas Bastard, an architect of Blandford, and had issue six sons and four daughters. Creech's parents were not rich. His classical training was due to Thomas Curgenven, rector of Folke in Dorset, but best known as master of Sherborne school, to whom Creech afterwards dedicated his translation of the seventh idyll of Theocritus, and to whom he acknowledged his debt in the preface to his translation of Horace. His education was supported from Colonel Strangways, a member of a well-known county family.

In Lent term 1675 Creech was admitted as a commoner at Wadham College, Oxford, and placed under the tuition of Robert Pitt. Creech's translation of one of the idylls of Theocritus is inscribed to his "chum Mr. Hody of Wadham College", and another is dedicated to Robert Balch, who at a later date was his "friend and tutor". Two of his letters are printed in Evelyn's Diary. He was elected a scholar of his college 28 September 1676, and took degrees: B.A. 27 October 1680, M.A. 13 June 1683, and B.D. 18 March 1696. He was a reputed scholar, and one of the first to benefit by William Sancroft's reforms in the elections for fellowships at All Souls' College, where he was elected a fellow in 1683.

For two years (1694–6) he was the headmaster of Sherborne School, but he then returned to Oxford, where a strangeness of manner was noticed in 1698. He accepted the college living of Welwyn, to which he was instituted 25 April 1699, but never entered into residence. After he had been missing for five days he was discovered (in July 1700) to have committed suicide in a garret in the house of Mr. Ives, an apothecary, with whom he lodged. He had wished to marry Miss Philadelphia Playdell of St. Giles, Oxford, but her friends would not consent to the marriage. In his will, dated 18 January 1699, and proved 28 June 1700, he divided his means into two parts, one of which he left to his sister Bridget Bastard for the use of his father during his lifetime and afterwards for herself, while he left the other moiety to Miss Playdell and appointed her sole executrix. She later married Ralph Hobson, butler of Christ Church, Oxford, and died in 1706, aged 34. He was also short of money.

There were printed after his death two tracts:

- A Step to Oxford, or a Mad Essay on the Reverend Mr. Tho. Creech's hanging himself (as 'tis said) for love. With the Character of his Mistress, 1700.
- Daphnis, or a Pastoral Elegy upon the unfortunate and much-lamented death of Mr. Thomas Creech, 1700; second edition (corrected) 1701, and it is also found in ‘A Collection of the best English Poetry,’ vol. i. 1717.

His portrait, three-quarters oval in a clerical habit, was given by Humphrey Bartholomew to the picture gallery at Oxford. It was engraved by R. White and also by Van der Gucht.

== Works ==
Creech's 1682 translation of Lucretius vied in popularity with John Dryden's Virgil and Alexander Pope's Homer. A second edition appeared in the following year with extra commendatory verses in Latin and English, some of which bore the names of Nahum Tate, Thomas Otway, Aphra Behn, Richard Duke, and Edmund Waller; and when Dryden published his translations from Theocritus, Lucretius, and Horace, he made flattering comments on Creech's work in the preface. Creech's Lucretius was often reprinted, and was included in the edition of the British poets which was issued by Robert Anderson. An edition appeared in 1714 containing translations of verses previously omitted and numerous notes from another hand designed to set forth a complete system of Epicurean philosophy.

The success of his translation of Lucretius induced Creech to undertake an edition of the original work. It appeared in 1695 with the title 'Titi Lucretii Cari de rerum natura libri sex, quibus interpretationem et notas addidit Thomas Creech,' and was dedicated to his friend Christopher Codrington. This edition was also often republished, in particular at Glasgow in 1753. Creech's agreement with Abel Swalle for the preparation of this volume is among the Ballard MSS. at the Bodleian Library. H. A. J. Munro in his edition of Lucretius wrote of Creech as borrowing annotations mainly from Lambinus, attributing the popularity of the work to their clarity and brevity.

In 1684 Creech published 'The Odes, Satyrs, and Epistles of Horace. Done into English;' it was reprinted in the same year, and again in 1688, 1715, 1720, and 1737. Other translations by Creech consisted of:

- Several elegies from Ovid with the second and third eclogues of Virgil in a collection of 'Miscellany Poems,' 1684.
- Laconick Apothegms, or remarkable sayings of the Spartans in 'Plutarch's Morals,' 1684, vol. i. pt. iii. 135–204; a Discourse concerning Socrates his Demon, ib. ii. pt. vi. 1–59; the first two books of the Symposiacks, ib. ii. pt. vi. 61–144, iii. pt. viii. 139–418.
- Lives of Solon, Pelopidas, and Cleomenes in Plutarch's Lives, 1683–6, 5 vols., an edition often reprinted in the first half of the eighteenth century.
- Idylliums of Theocritus, with Rapin's discourse of Pastorals, done into English, 1684, and reprinted in 1721, which was dedicated to Arthur Charlett.
- The thirteenth Satire of Juvenal, with notes, in the translation 'by Mr. Dryden and other eminent hands,' 1693.
- Verses of Santolius Victorinus, prefixed to 'The complete Gard'ner of de la Quintinye, made English by John Evelyn,' 1693.
- The five books of M. Manilius containing a system of the ancient astronomy and astrology, done into English verse, with notes, 1697.
- Life of Pelopidas in the 'Lives of Illustrious Men' by Cornelius Nepos, translated by the Hon. Mr. Finch, Mr. Creech, and others, 1713.

Creech was engaged at the time of his death on an edition of Justin Martyr.

== Notes ==
=== Attribution ===
- This article incorporates text from a publication now in the public domain: Courtney, William Prideaux (1888). "Creech, Thomas". In Stephen, Leslie (ed.). Dictionary of National Biography. Vol. 13. London: Smith, Elder & Co. pp. 64–67.
