= Robert Pitt (physician) =

English physician

Robert Pitt M.D. (1653–1713) was an English physician.

== Life ==
The son of Robert Pitt, he was born at Blandford Forum in Dorset; Christopher Pitt the poet was his nephew. He matriculated at Wadham College, Oxford, on 2 April 1669, and was elected to a scholarship there in 1670. He graduated B.A. in 1672, was elected a Fellow of his college in 1674 and Dean in 1677, graduated M.A. in 1675, M.B. in 1678, and M.D. on 16 February 1682. He taught anatomy at Oxford, and was elected Fellow of the Royal Society on 20 December 1682.

In 1684 Pitt settled in London, and was admitted a candidate or member of the Royal College of Physicians on 22 December. He was created a fellow by the new charter of James II, and admitted on 12 April 1687. He was a censor in 1687 and 1702.

Pitt lived in 1685 in the parish of St. Peter-le-Poer, in the city of London; in 1703, and till his death, in Hatton Garden. On the death of Francis Bernard he was, on 23 February 1698, elected physician to St. Bartholomew's Hospital, and held the post until 1707.

Pitt died on 13 January 1713.

== Works ==
Pitt took part in the controversy which followed the establishment of a dispensary by the College of Physicians in 1696. He published in 1702 The Craft and Frauds of Physick exposed, dedicated to Sir William Prichard, president, and to the governors of St. Bartholomew's Hospital, and written to show the low cost of the useful drugs, the worthlessness of some expensive ones, and the dangers of taking too much physic. Sarsaparilla, which for more than a hundred years later was a highly esteemed drug, was detected by Pitt to be inert; and he condemned the use of bezoar, of powder of vipers, of mummy, and of many other once famous therapeutic agents, on the ground that accurate tests proved them of no effect. A second and third edition appeared in 1703. In 1704 he published The Antidote, or the Preservative of Life and Health and the Restorative of Physick to its Sincerity and Perfection, and in 1705 The Frauds and Villainies of the Common Practice of Physic demonstrated to be curable by the College Dispensary. He was attacked by Joseph Browne in 1704 in a book The Modern Practice of Physick vindicated from the groundless imputations of Dr. Pitt.

Pitt also published a paper in the Philosophical Transactions for 1691 on the weight of the land tortoise. The observations, work with Sir George Ent, compared the weight of the reptile before and after hibernation for a series of years.

== Family ==
Pitt married Martha, daughter of John Nourse of Wood Eaton, Oxfordshire, in 1686.

== Notes ==
Attribution

This article incorporates text from a publication now in the public domain: Lee, Sidney, ed. (1896). "Pitt, Robert". Dictionary of National Biography. Vol. 45. London: Smith, Elder & Co.
