= Richard Duke =

English clergyman and poet

- Born: 13 June 1658; London, England
- Died: 11 February 1711 (aged 52)

Richard Duke (13 June 1658 – 11 February 1711) was an English clergyman and poet, associated with the Tory writers of the Restoration era.

== Life ==
He was born in London, son of Richard Duke, and was admitted to Westminster School in 1670. He was elected to Trinity College, Cambridge, in 1675, and proceeded B.A. in 1678, M.A. in 1682. He mingled with courtiers, playwrights and actors, and was a general favourite.

Before the accession of James II, he entered into holy orders and was in 1687 presented to the rectory of Blaby in Leicestershire. In 1688 he was made a prebendary of Gloucester Cathedral, and soon afterwards became Gloucester proctor in convocation and also chaplain to Queen Anne.

Jonathan Trelawney, bishop of Winchester, in June 1707 made Duke his chaplain, and in July 1710 presented him to the living of Witney, Oxfordshire. Having returned from an entertainment on Saturday night, 10 February 1711, he was found dead in his bed next morning.

Francis Atterbury and Matthew Prior had been among his close friends, and on 16 February Jonathan Swift recorded Duke's death in his Journal to Stella, describing him as a wit.

== Works ==
He probably wrote much satirical verse, which can only be identified occasionally by internal evidence. Among works by Duke was the caustic satire on Titus Oates, printed by Nathanael Thompson, ‘A Panegyrick upon Oates,’ which is referred to in Duke's acknowledged companion poem, ‘An Epithalamium upon the Marriage of Captain William Bedloe,’ issued at Christmas 1679, and this was followed, near the end of August 1680, by ‘Funeral Tears upon the Death of Captain William Bedloe.’

He complimented the queen at Cambridge, September 1681. With Wentworth Dillon, 4th Earl of Roscommon, Duke wrote several lampoons on the Duke of Monmouth during his so-called progresses in the west. He wrote in 1683, while a fellow of Trinity, an ‘Ode on the Marriage of Prince George of Denmark and the Lady Anne.’ On the death of Charles II he produced a poem beginning ‘If the indulgent Muse,’ &c.

He translated the fifth elegy of Ovid's book i., the fourth and eighth odes of Horace, book ii.; the ninth ode (Horace and Lydia) of book iii., and the Cyclops, idyl xi., of Theocritus, for John Dryden, with whom he appears to have been on terms of friendship, although he addressed him elsewhere as ‘the unknown author of “Absalom and Achitophel.”’ He praised him in a poem for his adaptation of Troilus and Cressida; he also complimented Thomas Creech (for his Lucretius), Nathaniel Lee, Thomas Otway, and Edmund Waller. He translated two of Ovid's epistles in 1683.

He wrote several original Latin poems and a translation of Juvenal's fourth satire. To Dryden's third ‘Miscellany,’ 1693, he contributed anonymously two amatory songs. His ‘Detestation of Civil War’ is expressed in a poem ‘To the People of England.’ One of his Dryden ‘Miscellany’ poems, ‘Floriana,’ had in 1684 celebrated the Countess of Southampton.

Three of his sermons were separately published, while he was rector of Blaby and prebendary of Gloucester. A small volume of fifteen sermons, praised by Felton, was issued at Oxford in 1714.

Duke's ‘Poems upon Several Occasions’ were collected in 1717, and published in conjunction with those of Roscommon, including the fragmentary beginning of ‘The Review,’ declared to have been never before printed. Jacob Tonson says that it was written ‘a little after the publishing of Mr. Dryden's “Absalom and Achitophel,”’ November 1681; ‘he was persuaded to undertake it by Mr. Sheridan, then secretary to the Duke of York; but Mr. Duke, finding Mr. Sheridan designed to make use of his pen to vent his spleen against several persons at court that were of another party than that he was engaged in, broke off proceeding in it, and left it as it is now printed.’
