= Ilija Gregorić =

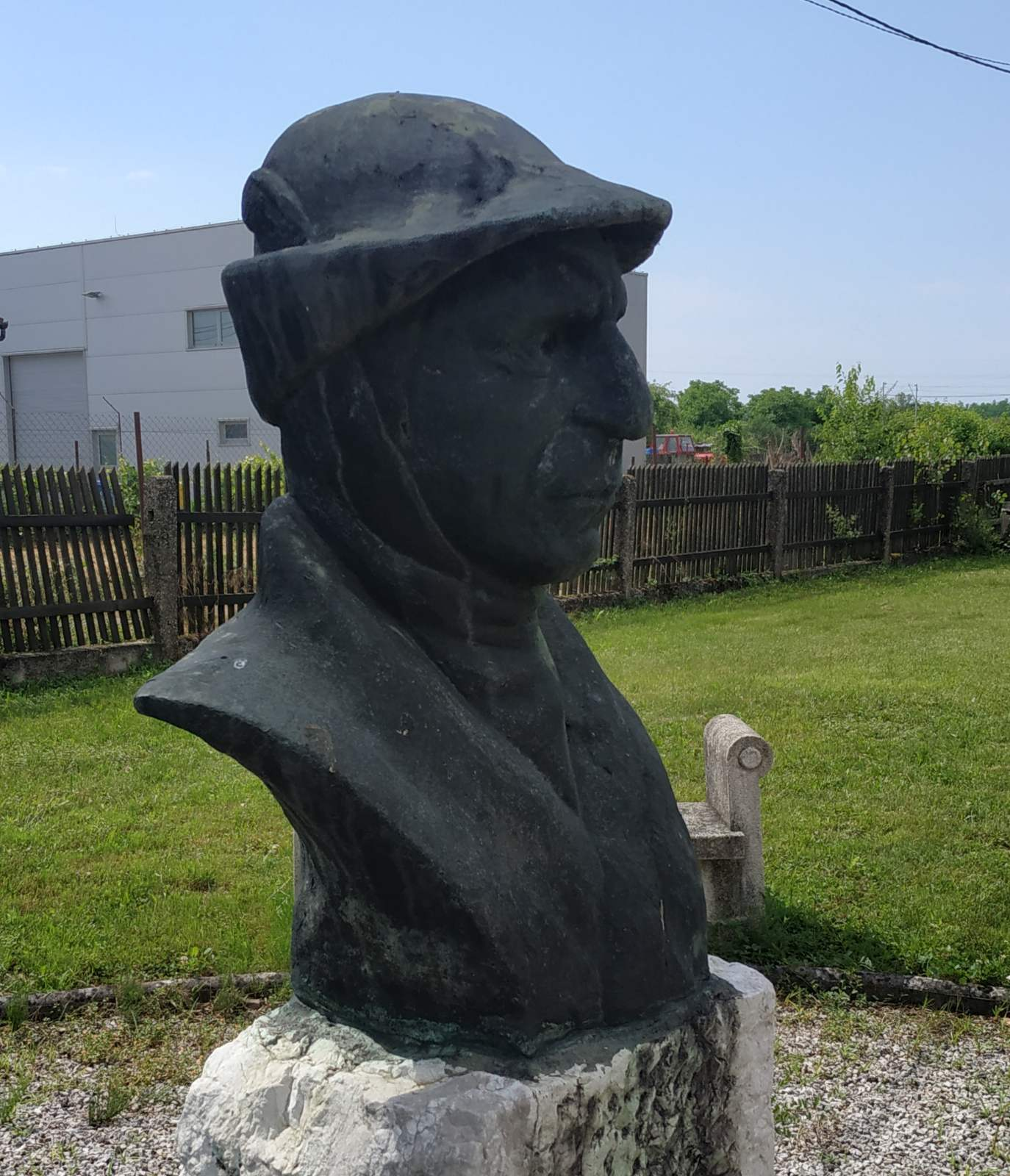
- An artist portrayal of Ilija Gregorić in Brdovec Museum.
- Born: Around 1520; Ribnik, Kingdom of Croatia
- Died: June 1574; Zagreb
- Military career
- Conflicts: -Hundred Years' Croatian–Ottoman War; -Susedgrad Wars; -Croatian–Slovene Peasant Revolt

Ilija Gregorić (c. 1520 – 1574) was a Croatian soldier, and a prominent peasant army commander from Croatian and Slovenian peasant revolt of 1573. He was also known under the nickname "Prebeg" (The Escapee) for escaping twice from Ottoman captivity.

== Biography ==
He originated from village of Ribnik, near Karlovac and was a serf on estates of Stjepan Frankopan of Ozalj. When Ottoman akinjis raided these lands in 1553, he was captured and taken into captivity. He nonetheless, escaped Ottoman captivity and settled again on Brdovec, where he had a house and a vineyard. He also earnt his salary as a soldier on Croatian Military Frontier, under command of captains Lenković and Semenić.

In 1564, as Ferenc Tahy. bought one part of Susedgrad-Stubica seigniory, including Brdovec, Gregorić became his serf. He took part in armed conflicts between Henning family and Tahy family for the control of Susedgrad castle. Three years later, as a semi-professional soldier, he raided Ottoman territories by order of Tahy's wife Jelena Zrinski. He was again captured by the Turks, and taken as prisoner to Constantinople. He somehow managed to get a hold on some axe, and break his shackles, which allowed him to escape again, after which he returned to Croatia in 1572.

Due to his previous military experience, rebel peasants elected him as the captain of their army. Now in command of the rebel forces, he tried to spread the revolt in Slovenia. His forces were defeated at the battles of Krško and Sv. Petar.

Unlike Matija Gubec, he was not captured immediately and he tried to seek shelter in Ottoman territories. He was captured near Jasenovac and brought to Zagreb, where he was executed.

== In popular culture ==
- Gregorić was portrayed by Serbian actor Bata Živojinović in 1975 Yugoslav-Croatian movie Anno Domini 1573.
