= Battle of Haarlemmermeer =

1573 naval battle of the Eighty Years' War

Coordinates: 52°22′33″N 4°40′59″E

- Part of the Eighty Years' War
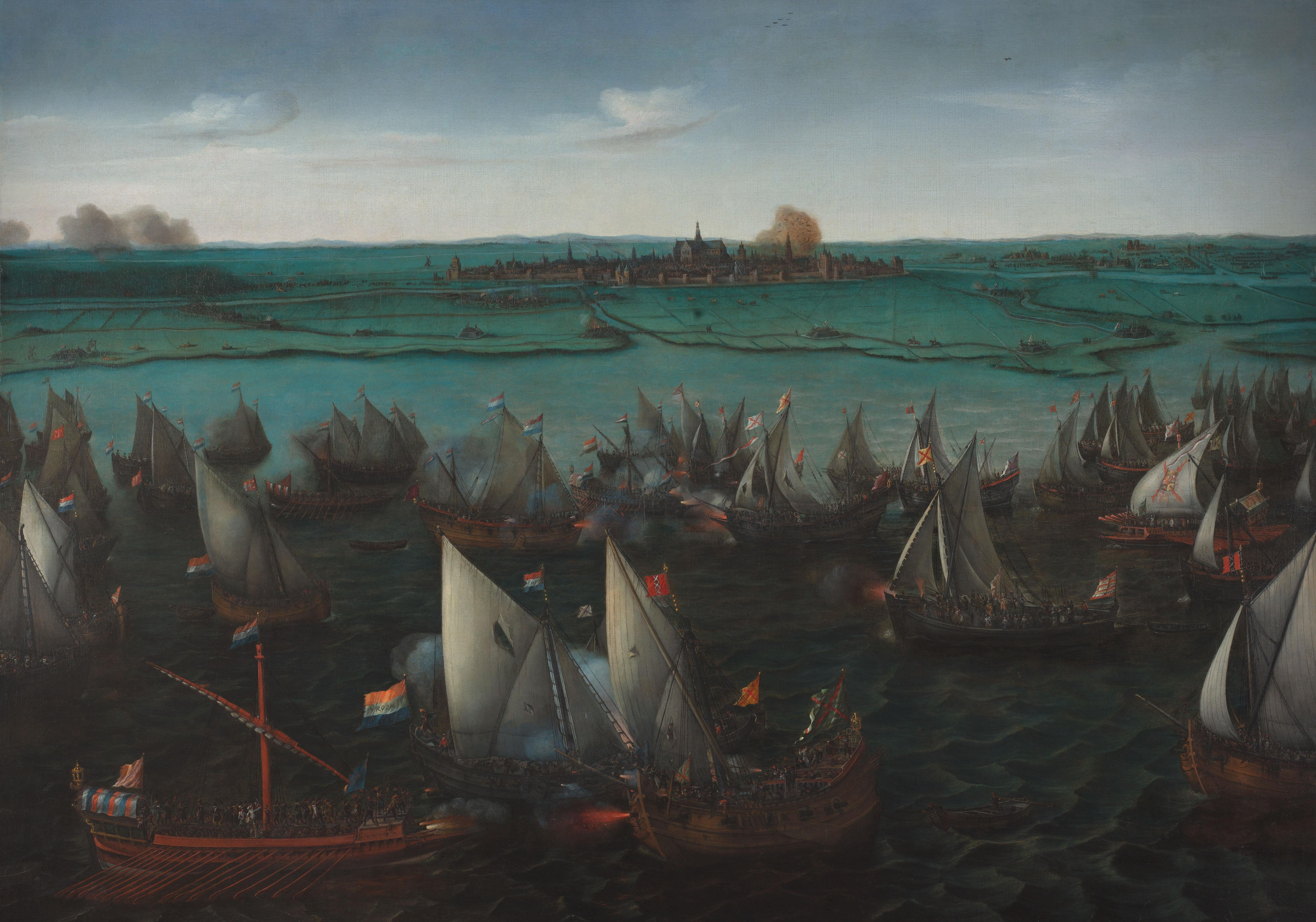
- Battle of Haarlemmermeer circa 1621 by Hendrick Cornelisz Vroom, oil on canvas. Rijksmuseum.
Date	26 May 1573
Location	Haarlemmermeer (present-day the Netherlands)
Result	Spanish victory

Belligerents
(Netherlands) Dutch rebels: Geuzen	Spanish Empire; Amsterdam

Commanders and leaders
Marinus Brandt	Count of Bossu

Strength
150 warships	100 warships

Casualties and losses
21 ships captured	Low

The Battle of Haarlemmermeer was a naval engagement fought on 26 May 1573, during the early stages of the Dutch War of Independence. It was fought on the waters of the Haarlemmermeer – a large lake which at the time was a prominent feature of North Holland (it would be drained in the 19th century).

A Spanish fleet and a fleet belonging to the city of Amsterdam (at the time still loyal to Spain), commanded by the Count of Bossu, fought a fleet of rebellious Dutch Geuzen, commanded by Marinus Brandt, who were trying to break the siege of Haarlem. After several hours of fighting, the Geuzen were forced to retreat.

== Trivia ==
Amsterdam Schiphol Airport is situated in what used to be the Haarlemmermeer.
