= Croatian–Slovene Peasant Revolt =

South Slavic peasant uprising against the perceived tyranny of a baron

Slovene-Croatian Peasant Revolt
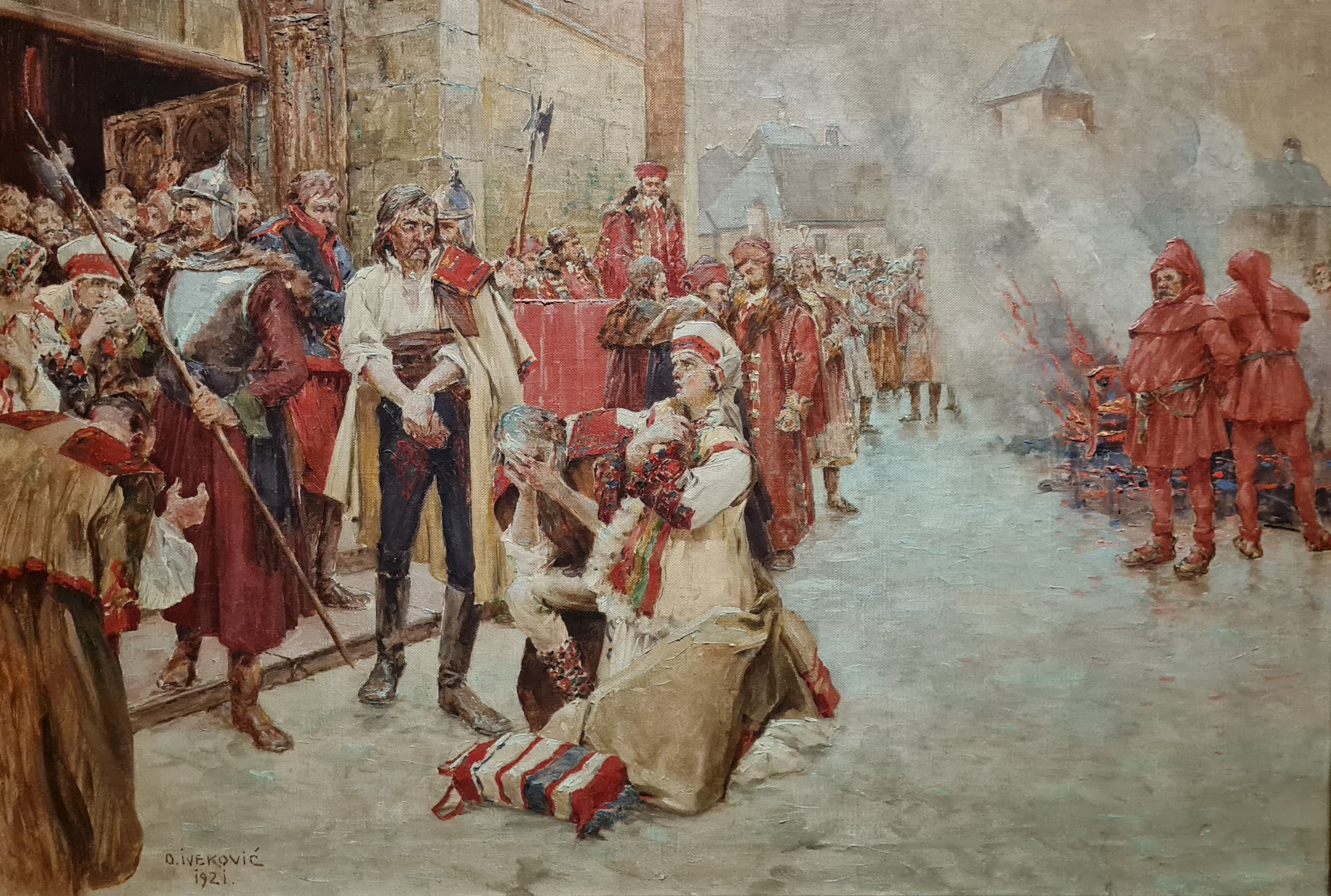
- A non-contemporary representation of the execution of Matija Gubec at the square in front of St. Mark's Church in Zagreb, by Oton Iveković (1912)
Date	28 January – 9 February 1573
Location	Northwest Croatia, Carniola and Styria, Habsburg monarchy
Result	Rebellion suppressed

Belligerents
Muška punta (Peasant Alliance)	Carniolan, Croatian, and Styrian nobility Uskoks

Commanders and leaders
Ambroz "Matija" Gubec (executed); Ilija Gregorić (executed); Andrija Pasanec (executed); Ivan Pasanec †; Nikola Kupinić	Juraj Drašković; Gašpar Alapić; Joseph Thurn; Ferenc Tahy; Vid Hallek

Strength
8,000–12,000 peasants	5,000 soldiers

Casualties and losses
3,000–5,000 killed	

The Croatian–Slovene Peasant Revolt of 1573 was a large peasant revolt on territory forming modern-day northwestern Croatia and southeastern Slovenia. The revolt, sparked by cruel treatment of serfs by Baron Ferenc Tahy and led by Matija Gubec, ended after 12 days with the defeat of the rebels and bloody retribution by the nobility.

== Terminology ==
The event is known in Croatia and Slovenia as the peasant revolt (Slovene: kmečki upor, Croatian: seljačka buna), or as "Gubec's Rebellion" (Croatian: Gupčeva buna) or "Gubec's peasant uprising".

== Background ==
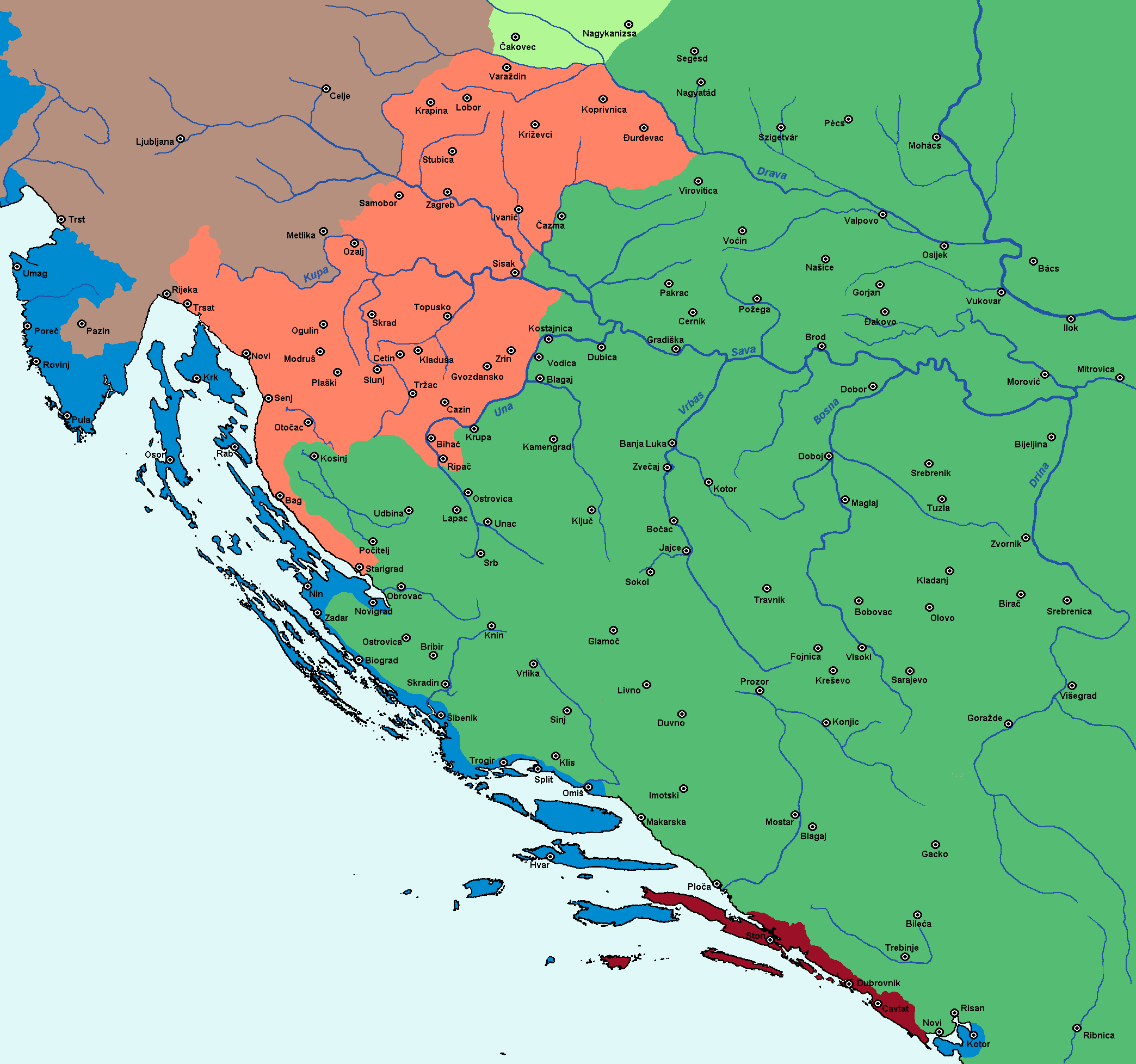
Map of Croatia in 1573, at the time of the rebellion Kingdom of Croatia Ottoman Empire Republic of Venice Archduchy of Austria Republic of Ragusa Kingdom of Hungary

In the late 16th century, the threat of Ottoman incursions strained the economy of the southern flanks of the Holy Roman Empire, and feudal lords continually increased their demands on the peasantry. In Croatian Zagorje, this was compounded by cruel treatment of peasants by Baron Ferenc Tahy and his disputes with neighbouring barons over land, dating back to 1564, which escalated into armed conflicts. When multiple complaints to the emperor went unheard, the peasants conspired to rebel with their peers in the neighbouring provinces of Styria and Carniola and with the lower classes of townspeople.

== Revolt ==
The rebellion broke out simultaneously in large parts of Carniola, Styria, and Croatia on 28 January 1573. The rebels' political program was to replace the nobility with peasant officials answerable directly to the emperor, and to abolish all feudal holdings and obligations to the Roman Catholic Church. A peasant government was formed with Matija Gubec, Ivan Pasanec, and Ivan Mogaić as members. Far-reaching plans were drawn up, including abolition of provincial borders, opening of highways for trade, and self-rule by the peasants.

The captain of the rebels, Ilija Gregorić, planned an extensive military operation to secure victory for the revolt. Each peasant household provided one man for his army, which met with some initial success; their revolutionary goals alarmed the nobility, however, which raised armies in response. The rebels used a network of informers who relayed the information on movements of the opposing units; in turn, spies among the peasants themselves passed the information on the spread of the rebellion to the nobility.

== Backlash ==
Map of the peasant revolt in the beginning of February 1573. Fire denotes villages in rebellion, swords denote battles, tower-besieged or captured castles. Palisades denote seats of captaincies in the Military Frontier.

On 5 February, Uskok captain and baron Jobst Joseph von Thurn (Croatian: Josip Turn) led an army of 500 Uskoks from Kostanjevica and some German soldiers that defeated a rebel detachment of Nikola Kupinič at Krško (in Lower Styria), which was the first larger rebel defeat. This rapidly weakened the rebellion in Carniola and Styria.

The next day, another rebel force was defeated near Samobor. On 9 February, the decisive Battle of Stubičko polje was fought. Gubec and his 10,000 men resisted fiercely, but after a bloody four-hour battle the baronial army defeated and captured Gubec. The revolt failed.

Retribution was brutal: in addition to the 3,000 peasants who died in the battle, many captives were hanged or maimed. Matija Gubec was publicly tortured and executed on 15 February. Officers Petar Ljubojević, Vuk Suković, and Dane Bolčeta (who were Orthodox), and Juraj Martijanović and Tomo Tortić (Catholics) were all sentenced to life in prison and lost all their property. Mogaić was killed in the final battle, and Pasanec was most probably killed in one of the skirmishes in early February. Gregorić managed to escape, but was captured within weeks, brought to Vienna for interrogation, and executed in Zagreb in 1574.

== Legacy ==
The revolt and torture of Gubec acquired legendary status in Croatia and Slovenia. It has inspired many writers and artists, including the writers Miroslav Krleža and August Šenoa (The Goldsmith's Treasure), the poet Anton Aškerc and the sculptors Antun Augustinčić and Stojan Batič. Croatian film director Vatroslav Mimica produced the film about uprising, entitled Anno Domini 1573, in 1975, as well as television series in four parts. Gubec-beg, the first Croatian rock opera (1975), was also inspired by the events. The painter Krsto Hegedušić made in 1969 the stage curtain for the Croatian National Theatre in Zagreb, titled A.D. 1573.

A museum near Oršić Castle in Gornja Stubica and one in Krško (Slovenia) are dedicated to the revolt.

A reenactment of the Battle of Stubičko polje, held every year since 2008, has since become one of the most popular historical reenactments in Croatia.

== Gallery ==
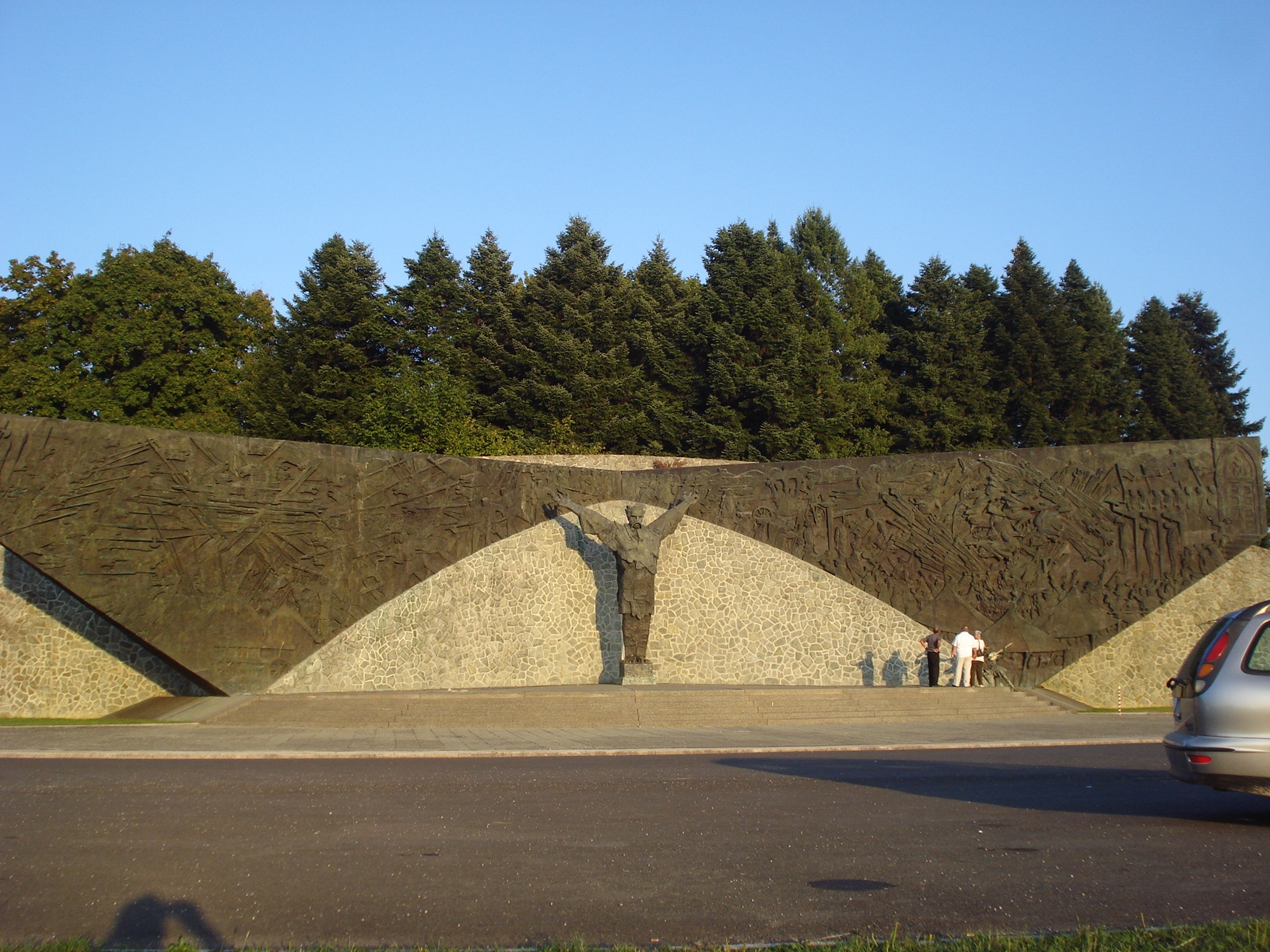
Large monument in Gornja Stubica
(Antun Augustinčić, 1971)

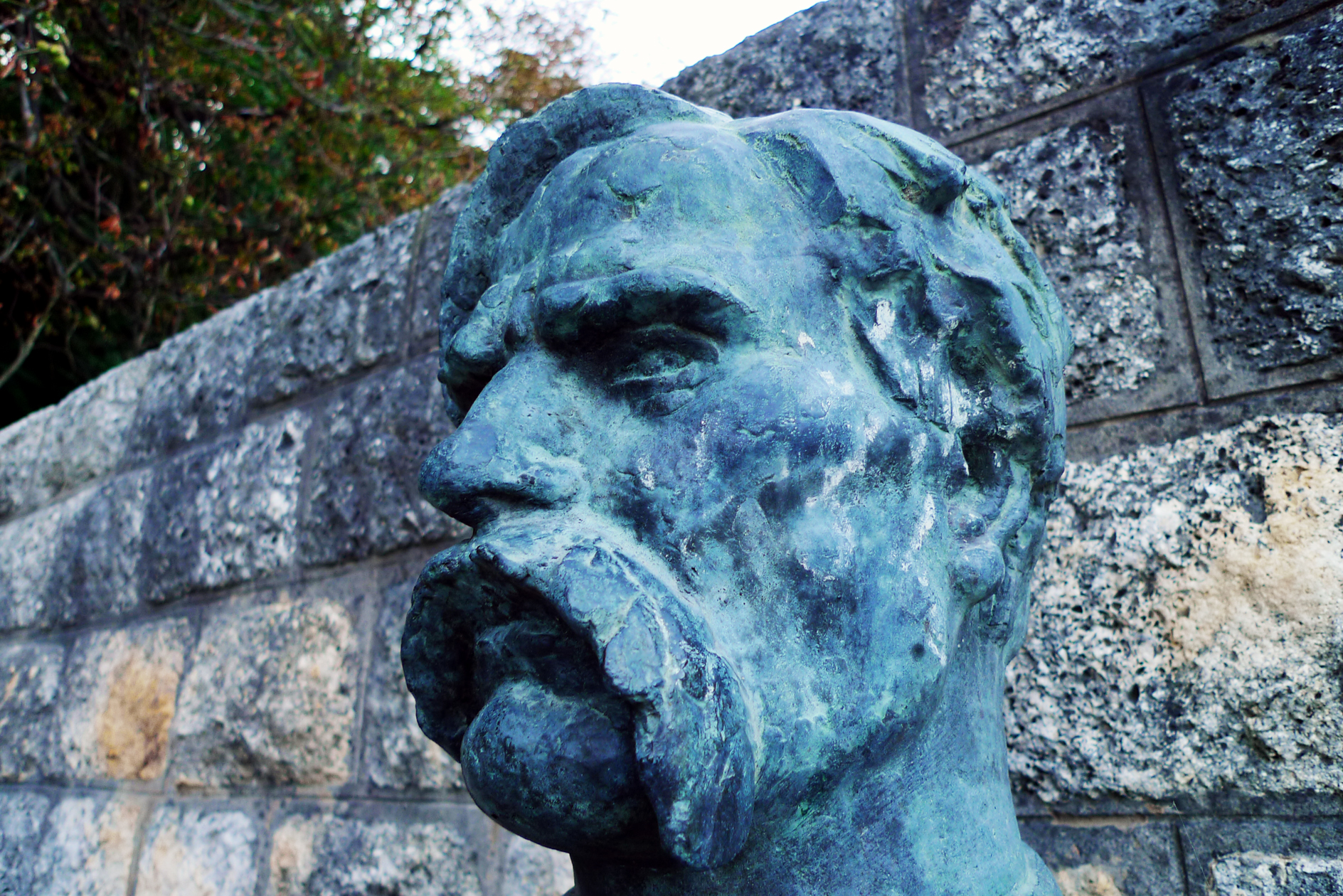
Matija Gubec's bust in Zagreb

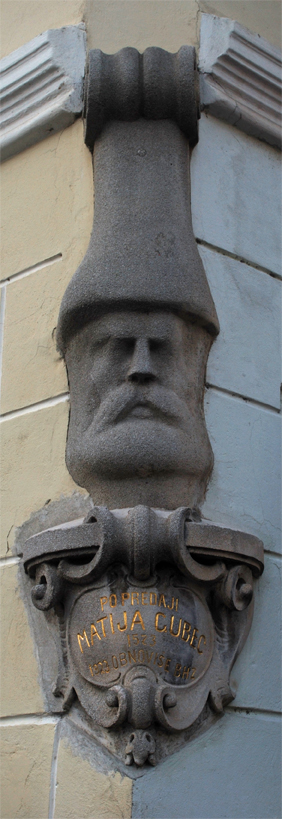
Statue of Matija Gubec, St. Mark's Square, Zagreb, Croatia

== See also ==
- Juraj Drašković
- Hvar Rebellion
