= Théodore de Mayerne =

Genevan-born physician (1573–1655)

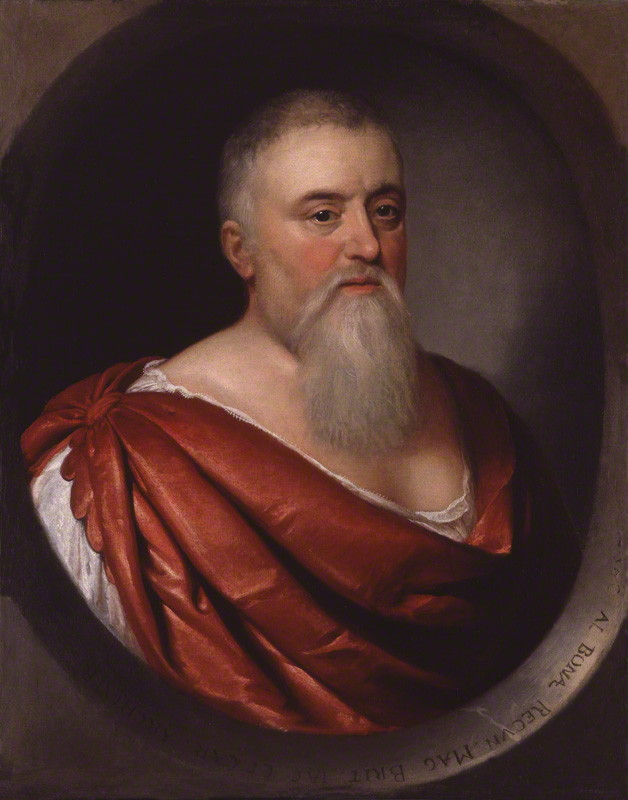
Sir Théodore de Mayerne by Paul van Somer I

Sir Théodore Turquet de Mayerne (28 September 1573 – 22 March 1655) was a Genevan-born physician who treated kings of France and England and advanced the theories of Paracelsus.

== The Young Doctor ==
Mayerne was born in a Huguenot family in Geneva, Republic of Geneva. His father was a Protestant French historian who had fled Lyon following the St. Bartholomew's Day Massacre and his godfather was Theodore Beza. Mayerne's first wife was Marguerite de Boetslaer and they had three children.

Mayerne studied first in Geneva and later moved to the University of Heidelberg. Later he moved to Montpellier to study medicine, graduated 1596 and received his doctorate in 1597. His dissertation defended the use of chemical remedies in medicine, under the guidance of Joseph du Chesne; this was the first intimation of his interest in Paracelsian theories. In May 1599, Mayerne joined Henri de Rohan, a Huguenot nobleman very powerful in Brittany, on his grand tour of Europe, visiting Germany, Italy, Bohemia, the Netherlands, England, and Scotland. During their visit to London in October 1600, Rohan and Mayerne were received by Queen Elizabeth I at her court, and in November 1600, when they reached Edinburgh, they were received by King James VI, before returning to France in early 1601. Despite his austere Calvinism, Mayerne greatly admired the many works of art and architecture he saw in his travels in Germany and Italy, especially liking the paintings of Albrecht Dürer and the Kunstkammer in Munich of curios kept by the Duke of Bavaria.

== The Paris Years ==
Mayerne moved to Paris, lectured on anatomy and pharmacy and founded a medical practice. By that time he had begun to support the views of Paracelsus and used many chemical remedies. He kept detailed notes about his patients, among them Armand du Plessis, later Cardinal Richelieu, whom he treated for gonorrhea in 1605.

In 1600, French royal physician Jean Ribit de la Rivière (1571–1605) sponsored him to become one of the personal physicians, physician in ordinary, of the king Henri IV. His other pursuits were thwarted because he was not a Catholic and because most French physicians still followed the principles of Galen. In 1603 he tried to support his views to Medical Faculty of Paris, stating that his views were not opposed to Galenic and Hippocratic principles.

Despite their opposition, he retained the favour of the King, who appointed him to travel with the Duc de Rohan in his diplomatic missions to Germany and Italy. When the King intended to make Mayerne his first physician, the queen opposed the decision because Mayerne refused to convert to Catholicism. Mayerne continued in his lower post until 1606 when he sold it to another physician.

At this time he continued his association with du Chesne and the circle of Hermeticists that had grown up around him. These devotees of Paracelsus believed they were reviving the wisdom of the mythical pre-Platonic natural philosophers - men known as the prisci theologi that included Zoroaster and Hermes Trismegistus. The alchemical nature of their experiments was greatly resented by Galenists at the University of Paris.

In the same year he briefly visited England by invitation and met James I. He became a physician of Anne of Denmark and was incorporated at Oxford on April 8, 1606. He probably spent the following years back in France.

== Life in England ==
When Henri IV was murdered in 1610, Mayerne moved to England, again by invitation. In 1611 he became first physician of James I and his queen, succeeding Martin Schöner. He also treated most members of the royal court, including Sir Robert Cecil and Henry Frederick, Prince of Wales. His inability to successfully treat those two individuals, together with his closeness to the scandal surrounding the murder of Sir Thomas Overbury coloured his first years in England. Nevertheless, he was sometimes sent on diplomatic missions to France.

In 1616 Mayerne was elected a Fellow of the Royal College of Physicians. He helped the Society of Apothecaries to obtain a royal charter separate from the Grocers and helped to found the Company of Distillers. He was knighted in 1624. Next year he briefly visited Switzerland, where he had become Baron Aubonne. Mayerne retained his post as a first physician after the accession of Charles I in 1625.

There were fears over the health of Henrietta Maria, and in July 1627 she travelled with Mayerne to take the medicinal spring waters at Wellingborough in Northamptonshire.

He successfully championed the effort to produce the first official pharmacopoeia, which would specify treatments that apothecaries should provide for specific ailments. In this he included chemical remedies, which were easier to introduce in Protestant England than in Catholic France.

In 1628 his wife died and in 1630 he married Elizabeth Joachimi. They had five children but only one daughter Marie from his first marriage survived to adulthood. At about this time he treated Oliver Cromwell for a variety of physical and emotional symptoms, including a severe depression. In response to the Plague of 1630, he suggested the institution of a centralized 'Office of Health', with free royal hospitals, trained officials, and regulatory power.

During the English Civil War Mayerne kept a low profile in his practice in London and retained the favour of the parliament. After the execution of Charles I in 1649, he became nominal physician to Charles II but soon retired to Chelsea.

Mayerne died at Chelsea on 22 March 1654 or 1655. He was buried in St Martin-in-the-Fields with most of his family and his godson Sir Theodore des Vaux sponsored a monument for him. Des Vaux later published Mayerne's medical notes in the book Praxis Medica in 1690.

== Legacy ==
Mayerne compiled the so-called 'de Mayerne manuscript' between 1620 and 1646 based on conversations with painters (and others). The manuscript includes contributions from Rubens, van Dyck, Mytens, Paul van Somer, and Cornelius Johnson. His estate included copious amount of medical manuscripts, including detailed notes about his patients, most of it in Latin and French; his patients ranged from John Donne to Oliver Cromwell. His papers are kept in the Royal College of Physicians.

His influence on the administration of medicine - including the first suggestion of socialized medicine in England, and the standardisation of chemical cures, has been widely recognised.

His 'Paracelsian' outlook, which viewed the world as 'abounding in chemical secrets waiting to be exploited', led him to devise projects to enhance Scottish coal mines, to reopen lead mines in Europe and to monopolize oyster beds. He made chemical and physical experiments, created pigments and cosmetics, introduced calomel to medical use and created black-wash (lotio nigra). It also led him to an interest in cooking, and he grew obese in later years.

In 1634, he wrote the introduction for and edited one of the first treatises ever published on Insects (usually attributed to Thomas Muffet), under the title Insectorum, sive minimorum animalium Theatrum: Olim ab Edoardo Wottono, Conrado Gesnero, Thomaque Pennio inchoatum: Tandem Tho. Moufeti Londinâtis operâ sumptibusque maximis concinnatum, auctum, perfectum: Et ad vivum expressis Iconibus suprà quingentis illustratum. Londini ex Officinâ typographicâ Thom. Cotes. Et venales extant apud Benjam. Allen, in diverticulo, quod Anglicè dicitur Popes-head Alley.

In 1701 Joseph Browne produced an edition of Mayerne's Latin casebooks which includes details of medical treatments given to several courtiers, documents concerning the final illness of Prince Henry, and a journal of his consultations with Anne of Denmark and Henrietta Maria. The edition is some respects unreliable with misleading punctuation.

== See also ==
- Timeline of hydrogen technologies
