= Joseph Browne (physician) =

Joseph Browne (fl. 1706), was an English physician, generally described as a charlatan and hack writer.

== Life ==
He has been identified with a Joseph Browne of Jesus College, Cambridge, who proceeded M.B. 1695; he assumed the title M.D.

In 1706 he was twice convicted for libelling Queen Anne's administration. The first of these occasions, when he was fined forty marks and ordered to stand in the pillory, was for the publication of The Country Parson's Honest Advice to that judicious and worthy Minister of State my Lord Keeper. In a letter addressed to Secretary Robert Harley, 'occasioned by his late commitment to Newgate,' he denies the authorship of this pamphlet, of which at the same time he gives an explanation. He also speaks of Harley as having 'not only treated him like a patriot, but given him friendly advice.' He was again fined forty marks and ordered to stand in the pillory twice.

== Works ==
He was an industrious writer with an obscure and rambling style. He wrote and lectured against William Harvey's theory of the circulation of the blood, and he continued The Examiner after it had been dropped by Delarivier Manley, who had succeeded Jonathan Swift.

He sought patronage, and was bold and importunate. His 'Modern Practice of Physick vindicated' (two parts, 1703–4) is dedicated to the Duke of Leeds without permission. He dedicated his 'Lecture of Anatomy against the Circulation of the Blood' (1701) to 'His Excellency Heer Vrybergen, Envoy Extraordinary from the States-General.' His 'Practical Treatise of the Plague' (1720) has a prefatory epistle to Richard Mead, and his last known publication, also on the plague, was addressed to the president and members of the Royal College of Physicians, with which he was not affiliated. Beyond the date of this publication (1721) there is no trace of him.

Browne produced an edition of the Latin casebooks of Théodore de Mayerne which includes details of medical treatments given to several courtiers, documents concerning the final illness of Prince Henry, and a journal of his consultations with Anne of Denmark and Henrietta Maria. The edition is some respects unreliable with misleading punctuation.
