= Lombard (gun) =

Renaissance cannon

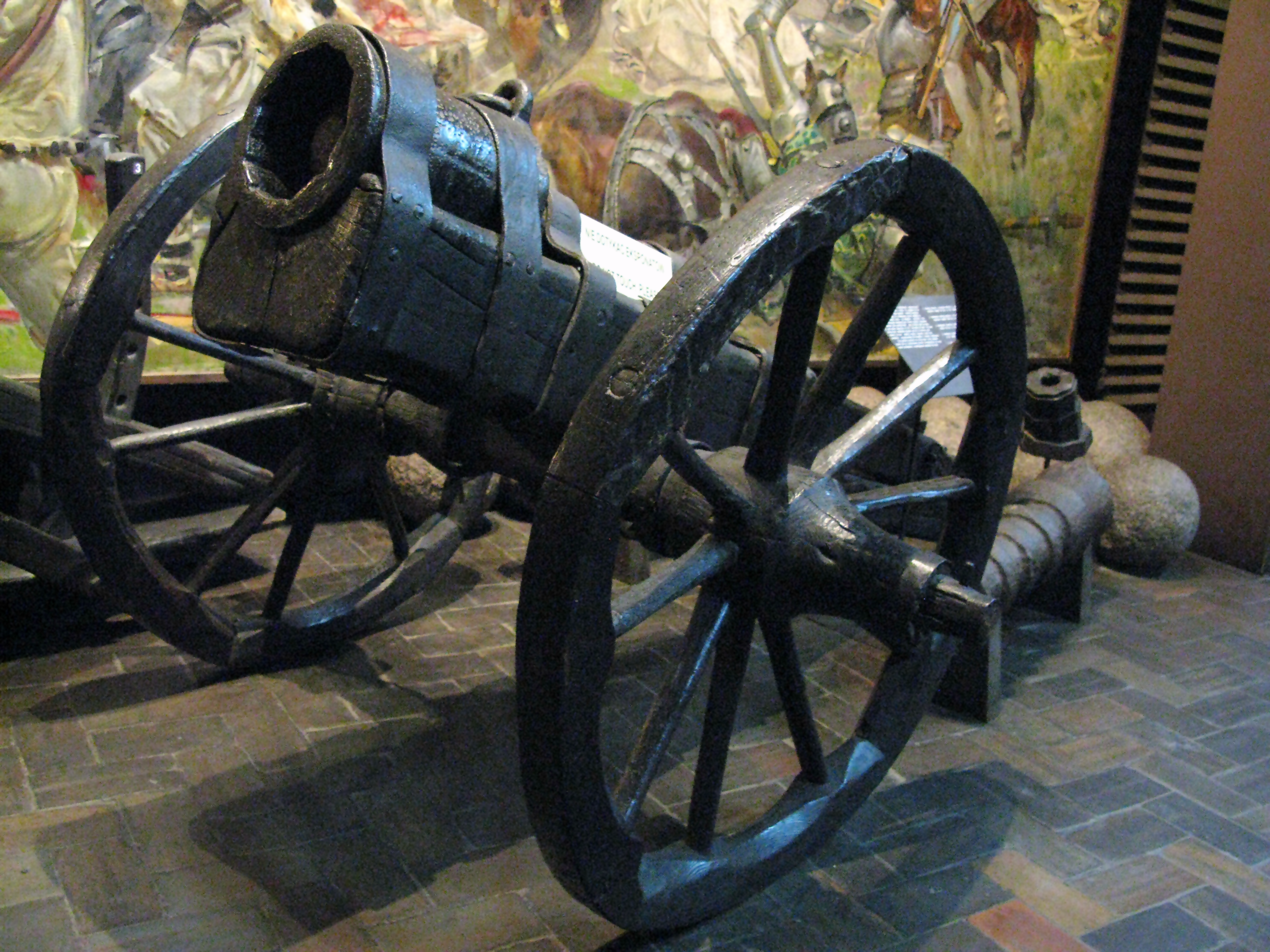
A 15th-century lombard from the collection of the Polish Army Museum, Warsaw

A lombard, also known as a lonbarda, wallbreaker, or quebrantamuro, was a smoothbore cannon used in the early Renaissance in Spain and Italy. Its ammunition consisted of 70–90 lb (32–41 kg) balls.

A lombard was used as an alarm to alert Christopher Columbus on the first of his voyages that land – what is now known as the Bahamas – had been sighted.
