= Battle of Stubica (1573) =

Battle of Croatian-Slovene Peasant Revolt

- Part of Croatian–Slovene Peasant Revolt
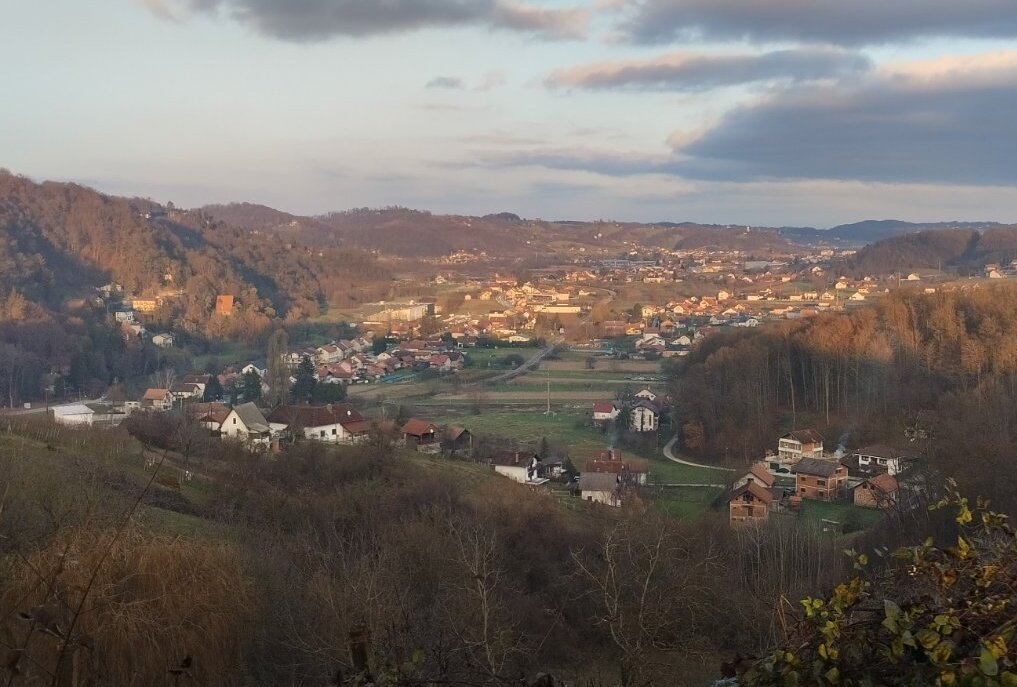
- According to historian Vjekoslav Klaić, field of Stubica seen in the picture, was a site where battle took place in 1573.
Date	9 February 1573
Location	Donja Stubica, Kingdom of Croatia
Result	Royal victory

Belligerents
Kingdom of Croatia	Rebel peasantry

Commanders and leaders
Gašpar Alapić Mato Keglević Vladislav of Plodvin †	Ambroz "beg" Gubec (POW) Ivan Pasanec (POW) Ivan Mogaić †

Strength
900 cavalry 4,100 infantry	5,000–10,000 peasant rebels

Casualties and losses
Unknown	Around 5,000 men

Battle of Stubica (1573) was the decisive battle of Croatian-Slovene Peasant Revolt of 1573. The battle ended in the defeat of peasant rebel army.

== Battle ==
Upon learning of the approaching Croatian army, the peasant rebel leader Gubec deployed his force in battle order and gave them a short speech in order to encourage them for the upcoming fight, saying that "this day and battle will bring them glory and freedom if they win [...] and cruelty and torture by raging nobility if they lose. They should therefore fight courageously like men." The Royal army commanded by Gašpar Alapić deployed opposite to the peasant army. Alapić placed his cavalry on both flanks and infantry consisting of musketeers along with artillery in the center. Noble army commanders gave speeches to their troops, reminding them of glorious battles they fought against the Ottomans and that they were "facing the enemy who not long ago carried plows and hoes".

When the speeches were over, both armies clashed while screaming and shouting. Tadija Smičiklas claims that noble cavalry first charged on the peasants. According to one account quoted by Vjekoslav Klaić, the battle raged for four hours. The peasants apparently fought bravely against their enemies and even inflicted casualties to some of them, including killing the noble cavalry commander Vladislav of Plodvin. Klaić also refers to some unnamed contemporary source which claims that the noble army prevailed after a contingent of haramijas arrived to the battlefield, helping them to destroy the peasant ranks. Another account of events claims that the peasant army collapsed after enemy cavalry charged at them "from two sides". After their formation collapsed, the remaining peasants started fleeing to the nearby hills and forests.

== Aftermath ==
After winning battle, the nobility started brutal campaign of vengeance on the defeated peasants, hanging them from nearby houses and trees. Many peasants captured alive on the battlefield were mutilated by cutting their ears and noses, so they would "carry the eternal and ugly memory of the rebellion". The nobility continued on with their brutal retaliation against the peasants for the next two days. The peasant leaders Gubec and Pasanec were captured and taken to Zagreb to be tried. Both were eventually tortured and executed.

== Gallery ==
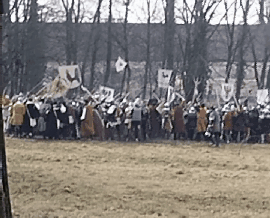
A reenactment of the battle made on its 450th anniversary in February 2023.

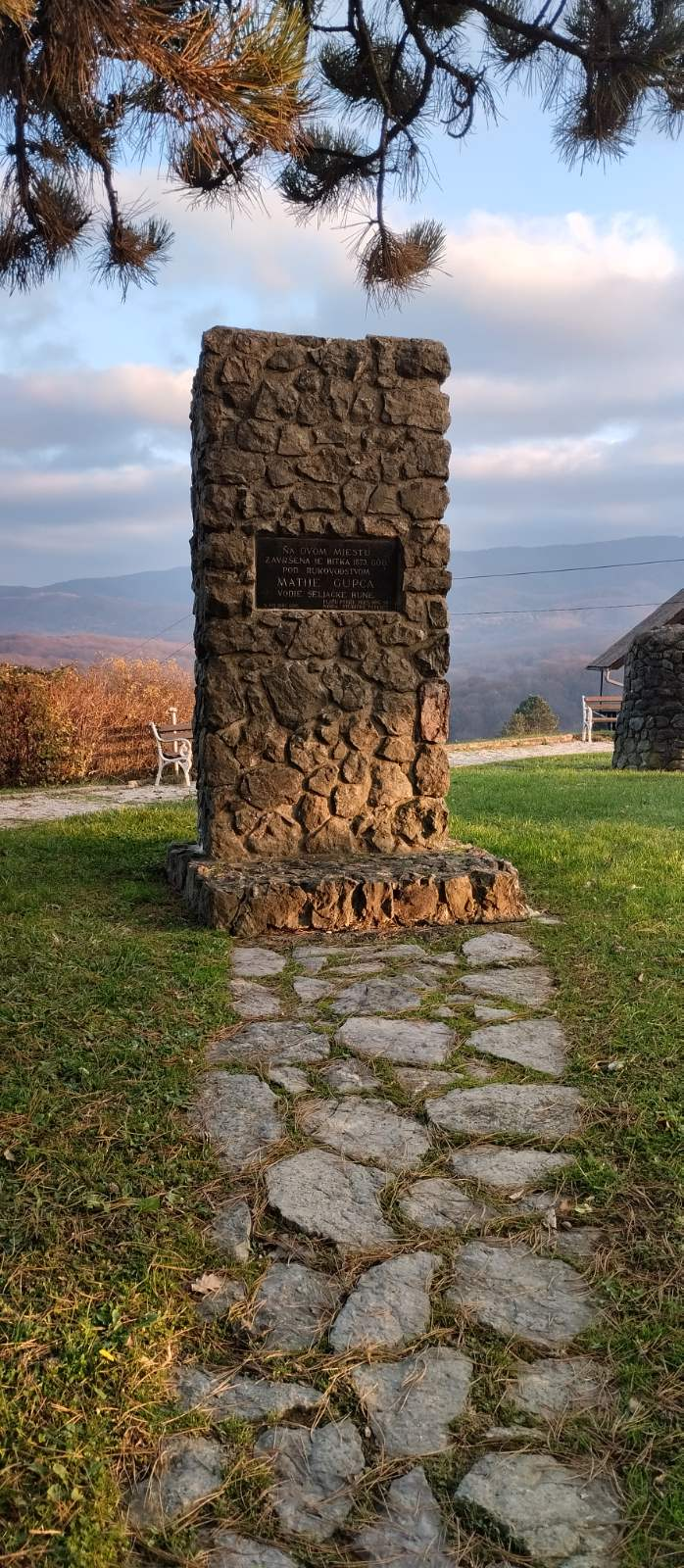
Monument to the peasants killed in the battle in Stubičke Toplice.

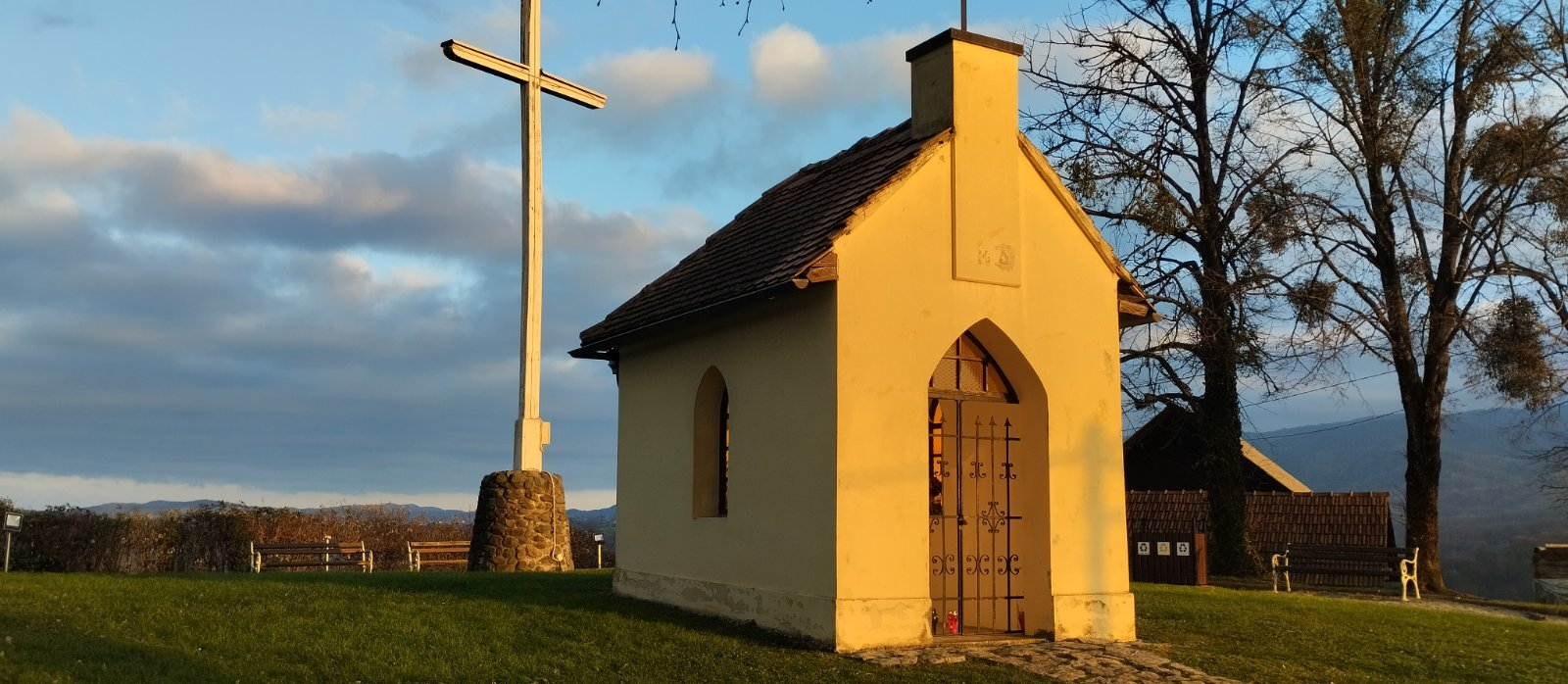
A Chapel of St. Katherine on Kapelšćak hill in Stubičke Toplice. According to a local oral tradition, remains of peasants killed in the battle were put to rest close to the chapel.
