= Matija Gubec =

16th century Croatian revolutionary

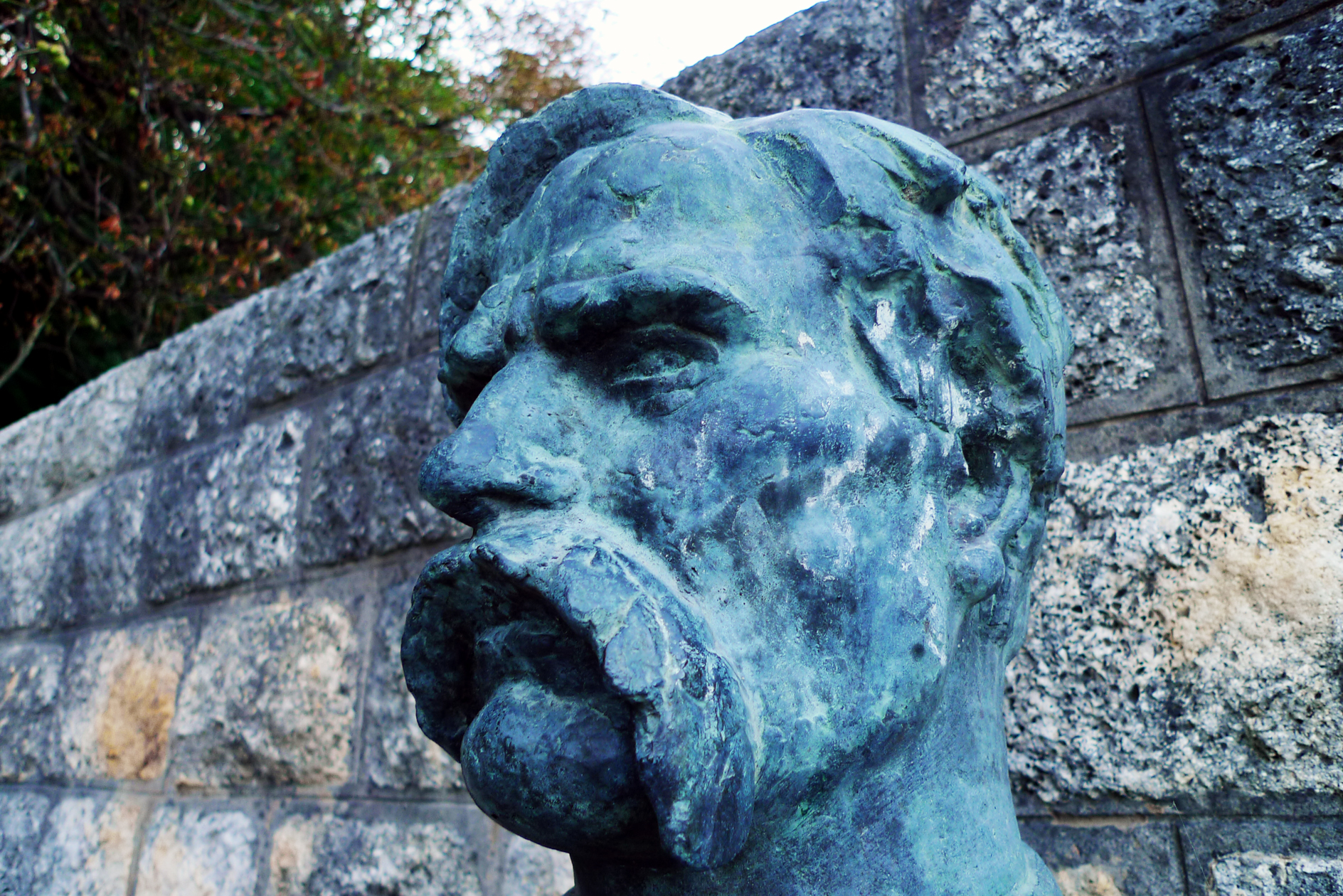
- Matija Gubec statue in Gornja Stubica, Croatia.
- Born: Ambroz Gubec c. 1548; Hižakovec, Kingdom of Croatia (now Hižakovec, Croatia)
- Died: February 15, 1573 (aged 24–25); Zagreb, Kingdom of Croatia (now Zagreb, Croatia)
- Known for: Croatian–Slovene peasant revolt

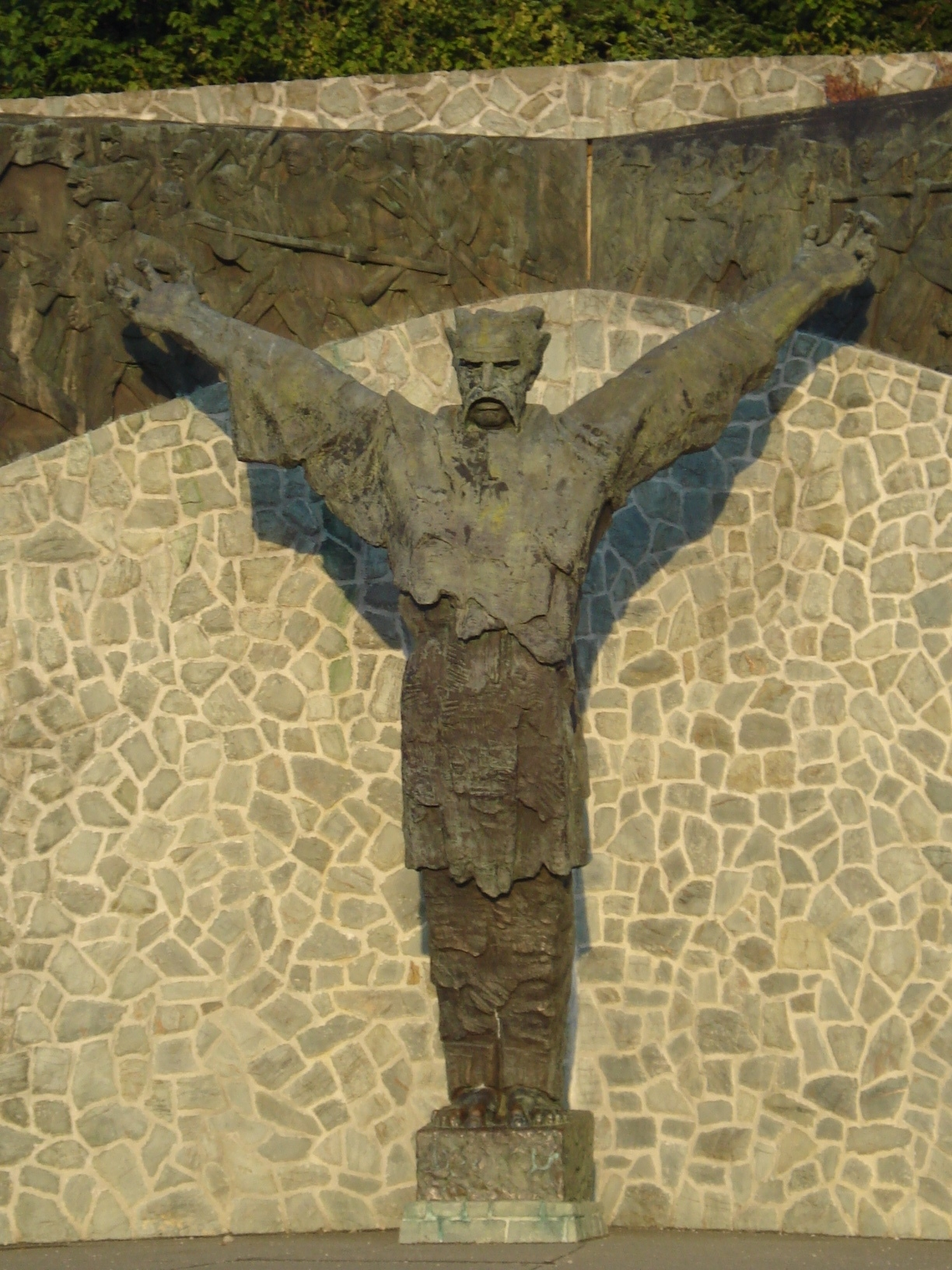
Matija Gubec statue in the large 1573 Peasants' Revolt monument in Gornja Stubica made in 1973 by Antun Augustinčić, a prominent Croatian sculptor

Matija Gubec (Croatian: [mǎtija gǔːbets]; c. 1548 – 15 February 1573), also known as Ambroz Gubec (or Gobec), was a Croatian revolutionary, and a leader of the Croatian–Slovene Peasant Revolt of 1573. He was part of the court of three people that governed the rebels.

== Biography ==
The name Matija first appears in the work of the Hungarian historian Miklós Istvánffy in 1622. Probably Istvánffy attributed this name to him after the good King Matija, and later the two, and the peasant king, György Dózsa (leader of the Hungarian peasant revolt in 1514), merged in folk traditions.

Before the revolt, Gubec was a serf on the estate of the landowner Ferenc Tahy. When the revolt erupted, the peasants elected him to be one of the leaders, and renowned for his personal qualities, he became the most influential leader of the rebellion. During his brief tenure he showed ability as a capable administrator and inspiring leader that would later create a legend. He earned the nickname Gubec Beg.

Matija Gubec led the poorly armed peasant army during its last stand at the Battle of Stubičko Polje on 9 February 1573 facing an army of the nobility led by bishop governor Juraj Drašković. Before the battle he made a speech trying to convince the men that only victory could bring them freedom, while the defeat would bring more misery. After the defeat he was captured and taken to Zagreb. On 15 February, under specific orders of bishop Drašković, he was publicly tortured and forced to wear a red-hot iron crown, cruelly dragged along the streets of the city, pinched with red-hot iron pincers, and was subsequently quartered.

== Legacy ==
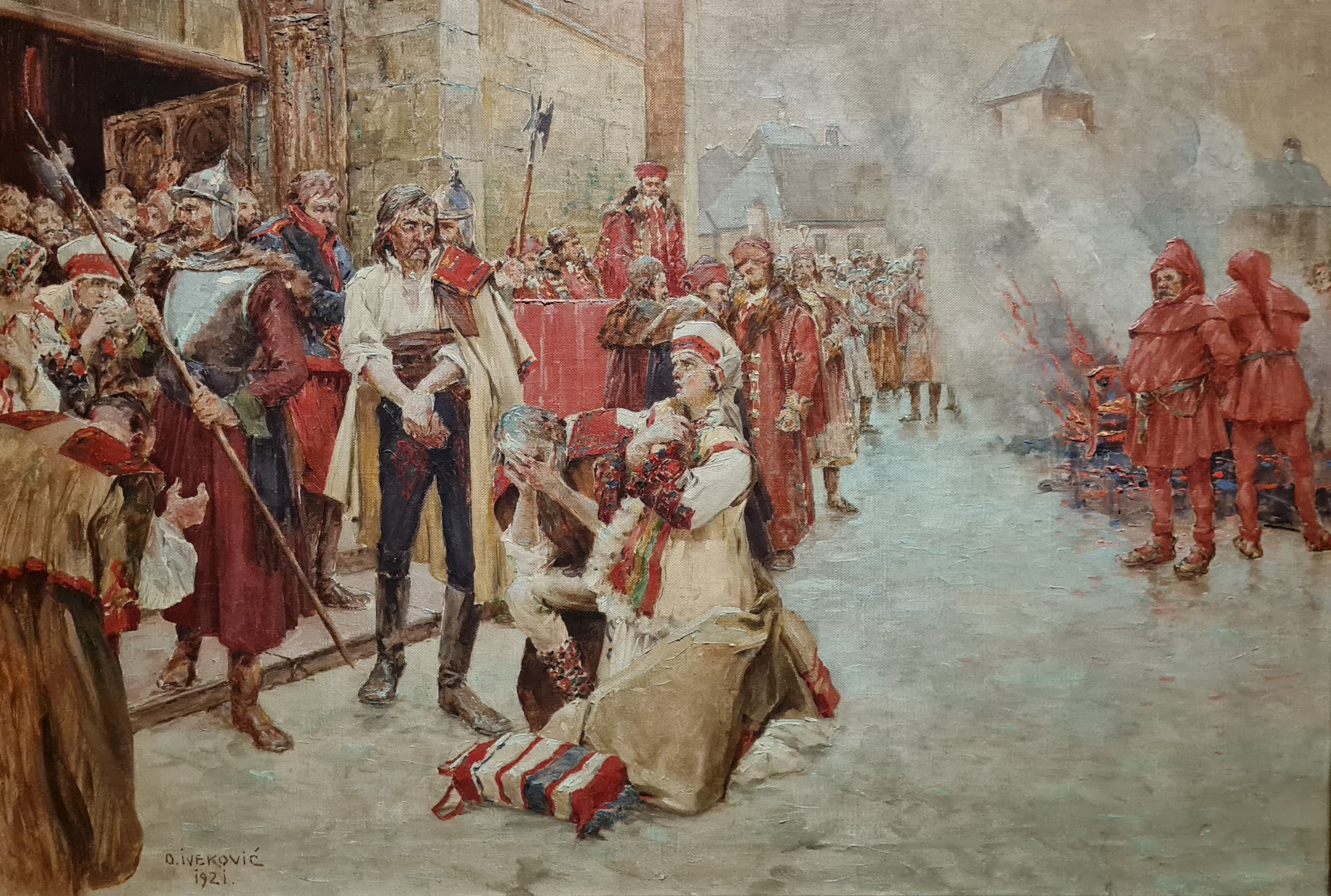
A representation of the execution of Matija Gubec in front of St. Mark's Church in Zagreb, by Oton Iveković

While Matija Gubec's cause was defeated, his legacy continued to be preserved in local folklore throughout the centuries. In the 20th century, the Croatian Peasant Party, and later Josip Broz Tito and the Yugoslav Partisans, embraced his cause as their own. During the Spanish Civil War, Yugoslav leftists who served in the pro-Republican International Brigades named their force the Grupo Matija Gubec. During World War II, a Croatian and Slovenian brigade were named after him. On 14 October 1973, on the 400th anniversary of the revolt, Tito ceremoniously opened the Museum to Matija Gubec and Antun Augustinčić's Monument to the Peasant revolt in Oršić Castle in Gornja Stubica, near Gubec's final battle. The museum continues to operate to this day.

Gubec is the protagonist of Gubec-beg (1975), the first Croatian rock opera, which told the story of the Peasant revolt. It was performed 212 times and was seen by over 400,000 people.

In 2008, a total of 362 streets in Croatia were named after Matija Gubec, making him the most common person eponym of streets in the country. In Serbia, 42 streets are named after Gubec, as of November 2024.
